

Deaths in September

 1: Wakanohana Kanji I
 5: Shoya Tomizawa
 27: George Blanda
 27: Real Quiet

Current sporting seasons

American football 2010

National Football League
NCAA Division I FBS
NCAA Division I FCS

Australian rules football 2010

Australian Football League

Auto racing 2010

Formula One
Sprint Cup
Chase
IRL IndyCar Series
World Rally Championship
Formula Two
Nationwide Series
Camping World Truck Series
GP2 Series
WTTC
V8 Supercar
American Le Mans
Superleague Formula
FIA GT1 World Championship
Formula Three
Auto GP
World Series by Renault
Deutsche Tourenwagen Masters
Super GT

Baseball 2010

Major League Baseball
Nippon Professional Baseball

Basketball 2010

Euroleague
Eurocup
Philippines collegiate:
NCAA
UAAP

Canadian football 2010

Canadian Football League

Football (soccer) 2010

National teams competitions
UEFA Euro 2012 qualifying
2011 FIFA Women's World Cup qualification (UEFA)
2011 UEFA European Under-21 Championship qualification
2012 Africa Cup of Nations qualification
International clubs competitions
UEFA (Europe) Champions League
Europa League
UEFA Womeen's Champions League
Copa Sudamericana
AFC (Asia) Champions League
AFC Cup
CAF (Africa) Champions League
CAF Confederation Cup
CONCACAF (North & Central America) Champions League
Domestic (national) competitions
Argentina
Australia
Brazil
England
France
Germany
Iran
Italy
Japan
Norway
Russia
Scotland
Spain
Major League Soccer (USA & Canada)
Women's Professional Soccer (USA)

Golf 2010

PGA Tour
European Tour
LPGA Tour
Champions Tour

Lacrosse 2010

Major League Lacrosse

Motorcycle racing 2010

Moto GP
Superbike World Championship
Supersport racing

Rugby league 2010

Super League
NRL

Rugby union 2010

2011 Rugby World Cup qualifying
English Premiership
Celtic League
Top 14
Currie Cup
ITM Cup

Snooker

Players Tour Championship

Days of the month

September 30, 2010 (Thursday)

Baseball
 Major League Baseball: The San Francisco Giants clinch at least a tie for the National League West title with a 4–1 win over the Arizona Diamondbacks.

Basketball
UAAP at Quezon City:
Men's Finals: Ateneo de Manila University 65, Far Eastern University 62, Ateneo win best-of-3 series 2–0
Ateneo clinch their third consecutive, sixth UAAP and 20th men's championship.
Women's Finals: Adamson University 56, Far Eastern University 54, Adamson win best-of-3 series 2–0
Adamson win their second consecutive and sixth UAAP women's championship.

Cricket
Ireland in Zimbabwe:
3rd ODI in Harare:  244 (49.4 overs; Ed Rainsford 5/36);  224 (47.4 overs). Ireland win by 20 runs; Zimbabwe win 3-match series 2–1.

Cycling
UCI Road World Championships in Melbourne and Geelong, Australia:
Men's time trial:  Fabian Cancellara  58:09.19  David Millar  59:11.94  Tony Martin  59:21.68
Cancellara wins the event for the second successive time and record fourth time overall.

Equestrianism
FEI World Games in Lexington, Kentucky, United States:
Reining Individual Final Competition:  Tom McCutcheon  on Gunners Special Nite 228.0 points  Craig Schmersal  on Mister Montana Nic 223.0  Duane Latimer  on Dun Playin Tag 222.5

Figure skating
ISU Junior Grand Prix in Sheffield, Great Britain:
Ladies Short Program: (1) Adelina Sotnikova  59.39 (2) Yasmin Siraj  55.66 (3) Yuki Nishino  51.96
Pairs Short Program: (1) Ksenia Stolbova / Fedor Klimov  54.17 (2) Taylor Steele / Robert Schultz  46.94 (3) Natasha Purich / Raymond Schultz  45.11
Men Short Program: (1) Joshua Farris  59.79 (2) Liam Firus  59.20 (3) Keiji Tanaka  58.28

Football (soccer)
OFC Women's Championship in Auckland, New Zealand:
Group B:
 3–0 
 4–0 
UEFA Europa League group stage, matchday 2:
Group A:
Lech Poznań  2–0  Red Bull Salzburg
Manchester City  1–1  Juventus
Standings (after 2 matches): Lech Poznań, Manchester City 4 points, Juventus 2, Red Bull Salzburg 0.
Group B:
Rosenborg  2–1  Aris
Atlético Madrid  1–1  Bayer Leverkusen
Standings (after 2 matches): Bayer Leverkusen 4 points, Aris, Rosenborg 3, Atlético Madrid 1.
Group C:
Gent  1–1  Lille
Sporting CP  5–0  Levski Sofia
Standings (after 2 matches): Sporting CP 6 points, Levski Sofia 3, Gent, Lille 1.
Group D:
PAOK  1–0  Dinamo Zagreb
Villarreal  2–1  Club Brugge
Standings (after 2 matches): PAOK 4 points, Dinamo Zagreb, Villarreal 3, Club Brugge 1.
Group E:
BATE  4–1  AZ
Sheriff Tiraspol  2–0  Dynamo Kyiv
Standings (after 2 matches): BATE 4 points, AZ, Sheriff Tiraspol 3, Dynamo Kyiv 1.
Group F:
CSKA Moscow  3–0  Sparta Prague
Palermo  1–0  Lausanne-Sport
Standings (after 2 matches): CSKA Moscow 6 points, Sparta Prague, Palermo 3, Lausanne-Sport 0.
Group G:
Hajduk Split  1–0  Anderlecht
Zenit St. Petersburg  4–2  AEK Athens
Standings (after 2 matches): Zenit St. Petersburg 6 points, AEK Athens, Hajduk Split 3, Anderlecht 0.
Group H:
Odense  1–2  Stuttgart
Young Boys  2–0  Getafe
Standings (after 2 matches): Stuttgart 6 points, Young Boys, Getafe 3, Odense 0.
Group I:
Sampdoria  1–0  Debrecen
Metalist Kharkiv  0–2  PSV Eindhoven
Standings (after 2 matches): PSV Eindhoven, Sampdoria 4 points, Metalist Kharkiv 3, Debrecen 0.
Group J:
Paris Saint-Germain  2–0  Karpaty Lviv
Borussia Dortmund  0–1  Sevilla
Standings (after 2 matches): Paris Saint-Germain 6 points, Sevilla, Borussia Dortmund 3, Karpaty Lviv 0.
Group K:
Steaua București  3–3  Napoli
Utrecht  0–0  Liverpool
Standings (after 2 matches): Liverpool 4 points, Napoli, Utrecht 2, Steaua București 1.
Group L:
Rapid Wien  1–2  Beşiktaş
CSKA Sofia  0–1  Porto
Standings (after 2 matches): Porto, Beşiktaş 6 points, CSKA Sofia, Rapid Wien 0.
CONCACAF Champions League Group Stage, matchday 5:
Group D: FAS  1–4  Olimpia
Standings (after 5 matches): Olimpia 10 points,  Puerto Rico Islanders 8,  Toluca 7, FAS 2.

Snooker
Premier League Snooker – League phase in Plymouth:
Marco Fu  4–2 Shaun Murphy 
Ding Junhui  3–3 Mark Williams 
Neil Robertson  2–4 Mark Selby 
Standings: Fu, Williams 3 points (2 matches), Murphy 2 (2), Ding 2 (3), Ronnie O'Sullivan , Selby 2 (2), Robertson 0 (1).

Volleyball
Men's World Championship in Italy:
Pool G in Catania:  0–3 
Pool H in Milan:  1–3 
Pool I in Catania:  3–0 
Pool L in Ancona:  0–3 
Pool M in Milan:  1–3 
Pool N in Ancona:  0–3

September 29, 2010 (Wednesday)

Basketball
FIBA World Championship for Women in Czech Republic: (teams in bold advance to the quarterfinals)
Group E in Ostrava:
 70–74 
 49–47 
 83–75 
Final standings: USA 12 points, Australia 11, France 10, Belarus 9, Greece 8, Canada 7.
Group F in Brno:
 64–65 
 84–70 
 76–67 
Final standings: Russia 12 points, Spain 11, Czech Republic 10, Korea 9, Brazil 8, Japan 7.
15th place playoff:  67–69 (OT) 
13th place playoff:  86–60

Cycling
UCI Road World Championships in Melbourne and Geelong, Australia:
Women's time trial:  Emma Pooley  32:48.44  Judith Arndt  33:03.61  Linda Villumsen  33:04.24
Men's under-23 time trial:  Taylor Phinney  42:50.29  Luke Durbridge  42:52.19  Marcel Kittel  43:14.30

Equestrianism
FEI World Games in Lexington, Kentucky, United States:
Dressage Grand Prix Special:  Edward Gal  on Moorlands Totilas 85.708%  Laura Bechtolsheimer  on Mistral Hojris 81.708%  Steffen Peters  on Ravel 78.542%

Football (soccer)
OFC Women's Championship in Auckland, New Zealand:
Group A:
 14–0 
 1–0 
WAFF Championship in Amman, Jordan: (teams in bold advance to the semifinals)
Group C:  0–3 
Final standings: Iraq 6 points,  3, Palestine 0.
UEFA Champions League group stage, matchday 2:
Group A:
Tottenham Hotspur  4–1  Twente
Internazionale  4–0  Werder Bremen
Standings (after 2 matches): Internazionale, Tottenham Hotspur 4 points, Twente, Werder Bremen 1.
Group B:
Hapoel Tel Aviv  1–3  Lyon
Schalke 04  2–0  Benfica
Standings (after 2 matches): Lyon 6 points, Schalke 04, Benfica 3, Hapoel Tel Aviv 0.
Group C:
Valencia  0–1  Manchester United
Rangers  1–0  Bursaspor
Standings (after 2 matches): Manchester United, Rangers 4 points, Valencia 3, Bursaspor 0.
Group D:
Rubin Kazan  1–1  Barcelona
Panathinaikos  0–2  Copenhagen
Standings (after 2 matches): Copenhagen 6 points, Barcelona 4, Rubin Kazan 1, Panathinaikos 0.
Copa Sudamericana Round of 16, first leg:
Banfield  2–0  Deportes Tolima
CONCACAF Champions League Group Stage, matchday 5: (teams in bold advance to the quarterfinals)
Group B:
Municipal  2–1  Columbus Crew
Santos Laguna  5–1  Joe Public
Standings (after 5 matches): Santos Laguna 10 points, Columbus Crew 9, Municipal 8, Joe Public 1.
Group C: Seattle Sounders FC  2–0  Marathón
Standings (after 5 matches):  Monterrey 13 points,  Saprissa 7, Marathón 6, Seattle Sounders FC 3.
Group D: Puerto Rico Islanders  3–2  Toluca
Standings: Puerto Rico Islanders 8 points (5 matches), Toluca 7 (5),  Olimpia 7 (4),  FAS 0 (4).

September 28, 2010 (Tuesday)

Baseball
Major League Baseball
National League:
Jay Bruce's first pitch walk-off homer to lead off the bottom of the ninth inning gives the Cincinnati Reds a 3–2 win over the Houston Astros and the Central Division championship, their first since , ending the fifth longest period between postseason appearances.
American League:
The Tampa Bay Rays defeat the Baltimore Orioles 5–0 while the New York Yankees beat the Toronto Blue Jays 6–1, filling out the complete American League postseason card, and eliminating the Boston Red Sox from playoff contention for the first time since .

Basketball
FIBA World Championship for Women in the Czech Republic: (teams in bold advance to the quarterfinals)
Group E in Ostrava:
 52–57 
 62–52 
 61–107 
Standings (after 5 games): USA, Australia 10 points, France 8, Greece, Belarus 7, Canada 6.
Group F in Brno:
 93–91 (OT) 
 77–57 
 48–81 
Standings (after 5 games): Spain, Russia 10 points, Czech Republic 8, Brazil, Korea 7, Japan 6.
13th–16th semifinals:
 71–69 
 69–74 (OT)

Cricket
Ireland in Zimbabwe:
2nd ODI in Harare:  238/9 (50 overs);  239/7 (48.5 overs). Zimbabwe win by 3 wickets; lead 3-match series 2–0.

Equestrianism
FEI World Games in Lexington, Kentucky, United States:
Dressage Team Grand Prix:   229.745%   224.767%   220.595%

Football (soccer)
WAFF Championship in Amman, Jordan: (teams in bold advance to the semifinals)
Group A:  2–2 
Final standings: Iran 4 points,  3, Oman 1.
Group B:  2–2 
Final standings: Kuwait 4 points, Jordan 2,  1.
UEFA Champions League group stage, matchday 2:
Group E:
Basel  1–2  Bayern Munich
Roma  2–1  CFR Cluj
Standings (after 2 matches): Bayern Munich 6 points, Roma, CFR Cluj 3, Basel 0.
Group F:
Chelsea  2–0  Marseille
Spartak Moscow  3–0  Žilina
Standings (after 2 matches): Chelsea, Spartak Moscow 6 points, Marseille, Žilina 0.
Group G:
Auxerre  0–1  Real Madrid
Ajax  1–1  Milan
Standings (after 2 matches): Real Madrid 6 points, Milan 4, Ajax 1, Auxerre 0.
Group H:
Partizan  1–3  Arsenal
Braga  0–3  Shakhtar Donetsk
Standings (after 2 matches): Arsenal, Shakhtar Donetsk 6 points, Partizan, Braga 0.
Copa Sudamericana Round of 16, first leg:
Defensor Sporting  1–0  Independiente
CONCACAF Champions League Group Stage, matchday 5: (teams in bold advance to the quarterfinals)
Group A:
Toronto FC  1–1  Real Salt Lake
Cruz Azul  2–0  Árabe Unido
Standings (after 5 matches): Cruz Azul, Real Salt Lake 10 points, Toronto FC 5, Árabe Unido 3.
Group C: Saprissa  2–2  Monterrey
Standings: Monterrey 13 points (5 matches), Saprissa 7 (5),  Marathón 6 (4),  Seattle Sounders FC 0 (4).

September 27, 2010 (Monday)

American football
NFL Monday Night Football Week 3: Chicago Bears 20, Green Bay Packers 17

Baseball
Major League Baseball:
Roy Halladay's two-hit complete game leads the Philadelphia Phillies to an 8–0 win over the Washington Nationals that clinches the Phils' fourth straight NL East title.

Basketball
FIBA World Championship for Women in the Czech Republic: (teams in bold advance to the quarterfinals)
Group E in Ostrava:
 54–93 
 58–48 
 87–46 
Standings (after 4 games): USA, Australia 8 points, France 7, Belarus 6, Greece, Canada 5.
Group F in Brno:
 59–86 
 96–65 
 76–53 
Standings (after 4 games): Spain, Russia 8 points, Czech Republic 7, Korea 6, Japan, Brazil 5.

Football (soccer)
WAFF Championship in Amman, Jordan:
Group C:  3–1

Volleyball
Men's World Championship in Italy: (teams in bold advance to the second round)
Pool A in Milan:
 3–2 
 3–2 
Final standings: Italy 6 points, Egypt, Japan, Iran 4.
Pool B in Verona:
 3–1 
 3–2 
Final standings: Cuba 6 points, Brazil 5, Spain 4, Tunisia 3.
Pool C in Modena:
 1–3 
 2–3 
Final standings: Russia 6 points, Puerto Rico 5, Cameroon 4, Australia 3.
Pool D in Reggio Calabria:
 3–0 
 3–1 
Final standings: United States 6 points, Argentina 5, Mexico 4, Venezuela 3.
Pool E in Turin:
 1–3 
 0–3 
Final standings: France 6 points, Czech Republic 5, Bulgaria 4, China 3.
Pool F in Trieste:
 3–0 
 1–3 
Final standings: Poland 6 points, Serbia, Germany, Canada 4.

September 26, 2010 (Sunday)

American football
NFL Week 3:
Tennessee Titans 29, New York Giants 10
Pittsburgh Steelers 38, Tampa Bay Buccaneers 13
Cincinnati Bengals 20, Carolina Panthers 7
Baltimore Ravens 24, Cleveland Browns 17
Dallas Cowboys 27, Houston Texans 13
Kansas City Chiefs 31, San Francisco 49ers 10
Minnesota Vikings 24, Detroit Lions 10
New England Patriots 38, Buffalo Bills 30
Atlanta Falcons 27, New Orleans Saints 24 (OT)
St. Louis Rams 30, Washington Redskins 16
Philadelphia Eagles 28, Jacksonville Jaguars 3
Arizona Cardinals 24, Oakland Raiders 23
Seattle Seahawks 27, San Diego Chargers 20
Indianapolis Colts 27, Denver Broncos 13
Sunday Night Football: New York Jets 31, Miami Dolphins 23

Athletics
World Marathon Majors:
Berlin Marathon:
Men:  Patrick Makau Musyoki  2:05:08  Geoffrey Mutai  2:05:10  Bazu Worku  2:05.25
Women:  Aberu Kebede  2:23:58  Bezunesh Bekele  2:24:58  Tomo Morimoto  2:26:10

Auto racing
Formula One:
 in Marina Bay, Singapore: (1) Fernando Alonso  (Ferrari) (2) Sebastian Vettel  (Red Bull–Renault) (3) Mark Webber  (Red Bull-Renault)
Drivers' championship standings (after 15 of 19 races): (1) Webber 202 points (2) Alonso 191 (3) Lewis Hamilton  (McLaren–Mercedes) 182
Constructors' championship standings: (1) Red Bull 383 points (2) McLaren 359 (3) Ferrari 319
Chase for the Sprint Cup:
AAA 400 in Dover, Delaware: (1)  Jimmie Johnson (Chevrolet; Hendrick Motorsports) (2)  Jeff Burton (Chevrolet; Richard Childress Racing) (3)  Joey Logano (Toyota; Joe Gibbs Racing)
Drivers' championship standings (after 28 of 36 races): (1)  Denny Hamlin (Toyota; Joe Gibbs Racing) 5368 points (2) Johnson 5333 (3)  Kyle Busch (Toyota; Joe Gibbs Racing) 5323

Badminton
BWF Super Series:
Japan Super Series in Tokyo:
Men's singles: Lee Chong Wei  def. Lin Dan  22–20, 16–21, 21–17
Women's singles: Jiang Yanjiao  def. Wang Xin  23–21, 21–18
Men's doubles: Cai Yun /Fu Haifeng  def. Koo Kien Keat /Tan Boon Heong  18–21, 21–14, 21–12
Women's doubles: Wang Xiao Li /Yu Yang  def. Cheng Shu /Zhao Yun Lei  21–17, 21–6
Mixed doubles: Zhang Nan /Zhao Yunlei  def. Tao Jiaming /Tian Qing  21–19, 22–20

Baseball
Major League Baseball:
The Philadelphia Phillies fail to clinch the NL East title, losing 7–3 to the New York Mets in their final home game of the season, but other results make them the first National League team to clinch a postseason berth.

Cricket
Ireland in Zimbabwe:
1st ODI in Harare:  200 (47.3 overs);  206/8 (50 overs). Zimbabwe win by 2 wickets; lead 3-match series 1–0.

Equestrianism
FEI World Games in Lexington, Kentucky, United States:
Reining Team Competition:   674.5 points   659   655.5
Endurance Team Competition:   23:53:36   24:49:46   25:34:16
Endurance Individual Competition:  Maria Mercedes Alvarez Ponton  on Nobby 7:35:44  Mohammed bin Rashid Al Maktoum  on Ciel Oriental 7:36:39  Hamdan bin Mohammed Al Maktoum  on SAS Alexis 7:36:56

Figure skating
ISU Junior Grand Prix in Karuizawa, Nagano, Japan: (skaters in bold qualify for ISU Junior Grand Prix Final)
Ice Dance:  Alexandra Stepanova / Ivan Bukin  130.08  Ekaterina Pushkash / Jonathan Guerreiro  129.71  Geraldine Bott / Neil Brown  123.65
Standings (after 4 of 7 events): Stepanova / Bukin 30 points (2 events), Anastasia Cannuscio / Colin McManus  22 (2), Gabriella Papadakis / Guillaume Cizeron  20 (2), Bott / Brown 18 (2), Ksenia Monko / Kirill Khaliavin , Charlotte Lichtman / Dean Copley  15 (1), Pushkash / Guerreiro, Victoria Sinitsina / Ruslan Zhiganshin , Anastasia Galyeta / Alexei Shumski  13 (1).

Football (soccer)
WAFF Championship in Amman, Jordan:
Group A:  2–0 
Group B:  1–2 
 Women's Professional Soccer Championship in Hayward, California:
FC Gold Pride 4–0 Philadelphia Independence
FC Gold Pride win the championship for the first time.

Gymnastics
World Rhythmic Gymnastics Championships in Moscow, Russia:
Groups hoops:   27.975 points   27.875   27.100
Groups ribbons and ropes:   28.050 points   27.900   27.150

Golf
PGA Tour:
FedEx Cup Playoffs: The Tour Championship in Atlanta:
Winner: Jim Furyk  272 (−8)
Final FedEx Cup standings: (1) Furyk 2980 points (2) Matt Kuchar  2727 (3) Luke Donald  2700
Furyk wins his 16th PGA Tour title and in doing so, wins his first FedEx Cup title.
European Tour:
Vivendi Cup in Chambourcy, France:
Winner: John Parry  271 (−17)
Parry wins his first European Tour title.
Champions Tour:
SAS Championship in Cary, North Carolina:
Winner: Russ Cochran  202 (−14)
Cochran wins his second Champions Tour title in as many events.

Korfball
Europa Cup first round in Wrocław, Poland:
Pool A:
Ceské Budějovice  18–6  AZS Wrocław
Trojans  9–11  Vacarisses
Ceské Budějovice  21–3  St Andrews University
Final standings: Vacarisses 12 points, Ceské Budějovice 8, Trojans 7, AZS Wrocław 3, St Andrews U. 0.
Pool B:
CC Oeiras  13–9  SKK Prievidza
CC Oeiras  19–8  Kocaeli University
KV Adler Rauxel  18–6  Bonson FJEP
Final standings: CC Oeiras 12 points, KV Adler Rauxel 9, SKK Prievidza 6, Kocaeli U. 3, Bonson FJEP 0.
5th place playoff: Trojans  16–7  SKK Prievidza
Top five teams advance to the Final Round.

Motorcycle racing
Superbike:
Imola Superbike World Championship round in Imola, Italy:
Race 1: (1) Carlos Checa  (Ducati 1098R) (2) Lorenzo Lanzi  (Ducati 1098R) (3) Noriyuki Haga  (Ducati 1098R)
Race 2: (1) Checa (2) Haga (3) Cal Crutchlow  (Yamaha YZF-R1)
Riders' championship standings (after 12 of 13 rounds): (1) Max Biaggi  (Aprilia RSV 4) 413 points (2) Leon Haslam  (Suzuki GSX-R1000) 350 (3) Jonathan Rea  (Honda CBR1000RR) 288
Biaggi becomes the first Italian to win the Superbike World Championship.
Manufacturers' championship standings: (1) Aprilia 433 points (2) Ducati 392 (3) Suzuki 379
Supersport:
Imola Supersport World Championship round in Imola, Italy: (1) Michele Pirro  (Honda CBR600RR) (2) Kenan Sofuoğlu  (Honda CBR600RR) (3) Eugene Laverty  (Honda CBR600RR)
Riders' championship standings (after 12 of 13 rounds): (1) Sofuoğlu 243 points (2) Laverty 227 (3) Joan Lascorz  (Kawasaki Ninja ZX-6R) 168
Manufacturers' championship standings: (1) Honda 295 points (2) Kawasaki 201 (3) Triumph 152

Pitch and putt
EPPA European Championship in Lloret de Mar, Catalonia:
7th-8th places:  7.5–0.5 
5th-6th places:  5.5–3.5 
3rd-4th places:   5.5–3.5 
Final:   4–5  
Catalonia win the title for the first time.

Snooker
World Open in Glasgow, Scotland:
Semi-finals:
Peter Ebdon  1–3 Ronnie O'Sullivan 
Mark Williams  2–3 Neil Robertson 
Final: Robertson 5–1 O'Sullivan
Robertson defends his title, and wins the sixth ranking title of his career.

Table tennis
Women's World Cup in Kuala Lumpur:  Guo Yan   Jiang Huajun   Guo Yue

Tennis
ATP World Tour:
Open de Moselle:
Final: Gilles Simon  def. Mischa Zverev  6–3, 6–2
Simon wins his seventh career title.
BCR Open Romania:
Final: Juan Ignacio Chela  def. Pablo Andújar  7–5, 6–1
Chela wins his sixth career title.
WTA Tour:
Hansol Korea Open:
Final: Alisa Kleybanova  def. Klára Zakopalová  6–1, 6–3
Kleybanova wins her second career title.

Volleyball
Men's World Championship in Italy: (teams in bold advance to the second round)
Pool A in Milan:
 3–1 
 0–3 
Standings (after 2 games): Italy 4 points, Egypt, Iran 3, Japan 2.
Pool B in Verona:
 0–3 
 3–1 
Standings (after 2 games): Brazil, Cuba 4 points, Spain, Tunisia 2.
Pool C in Modena:
 0–3 
 3–1 
Standings (after 2 games): Russia, Puerto Rico 4 points, Australia, Cameroon 2.
Pool D in Reggio Calabria:
 3–1 
 0–3 
Standings (after 2 games): Argentina, United States 4 points, Mexico, Venezuela 2.
Pool E in Turin:
 3–1 
 3–2 
Standings (after 2 games): France 4 points, Bulgaria, Czech Republic 3, China 2.
Pool F in Trieste:
 3–1 
 3–2 
Standings (after 2 games): Poland 4, Canada, Serbia 3, Germany 2.

Weightlifting
World Championships in Antalya, Turkey:
Men's 105 kg:
Total:  Marcin Dołęga  415 kg  Dmitry Klokov  415 kg  Vladimir Smorchkov  410 kg
Snatch:  Klokov 192 kg  Smorchkov 190 kg  Dołęga 188 kg
Clean & Jerk:  Dołęga 227 kg  Klokov 223 kg  Bartlomiej Bonk  170 kg
Men's +105 kg:
Total:  Behdad Salimi  453 kg   Matthias Steiner  440 kg  Artem Udachyn  440 kg
Snatch:  Evgeny Chigishev  210 kg  Salimi 208 kg  Udachyn 205 kg
Clean & Jerk:  Steiner 246 kg  Salimi 245 kg  Jeon Sang-Guen  242 kg

September 25, 2010 (Saturday)

American football
NCAA:
AP Top 10:
(1) Alabama 24, (10) Arkansas 20
(2) Ohio State 73, Eastern Michigan 20
(3) Boise State 37, (24) Oregon State 24
(5) Oregon 42, Arizona State 31
(6) Nebraska 17, South Dakota State 3
UCLA 34, (7) Texas 12
(8) Oklahoma 31, Cincinnati 29
(9) Florida 48, Kentucky 14
Other games:
(17) Auburn 35, (12) South Carolina 27
(15) LSU 20, (22) West Virginia 14
Played earlier this week: (4) TCU

Australian rules football
AFL finals series:
Grand Final in Melbourne:  9.14 (68)–10.8 (68) 
The Magpies and Saints will return to the MCG on 2 October for the first Grand Final replay since 1977.

Auto racing
Nationwide Series:
Dover 200 in Dover, Delaware: (1)  Kyle Busch (Toyota; Joe Gibbs Racing) (2)  Joey Logano (Toyota; Joe Gibbs Racing) (3)  Carl Edwards (Ford; Roush Fenway Racing)
Drivers' championship standings (after 28 of 35 races): (1)  Brad Keselowski (Dodge; Penske Racing) 4414 points (2) Edwards 4094 (3) Busch 3914
Busch sets a new record for NASCAR's second-tier series with his 11th win of the season.

Baseball
Major League Baseball:
The Texas Rangers clinch the AL West title with a 4–3 win over the Oakland Athletics.

Basketball
FIBA World Championship for Women in the Czech Republic: (teams in bold advance to the main round)
Group A in Ostrava:
 68–91 
 49–61 
Final standings: Australia 6 points, Belarus 5, Canada 4, China 3.
Group B in Ostrava:
 81–60 
 68–83 
Final standings: USA 6 points, France 5, Greece 4, Senegal 3.
Group C in Brno:
 66–68 (OT) 
 57–69 
Final standings: Spain 6 points, Korea Republic 5, Brazil 4, Mali 3.
Group D in Brno:
 59–77 
 60–66 
Final standings: Russia 6 points, Czech Republic 5, Japan 4, Argentina 3.

Figure skating
ISU Junior Grand Prix in Karuizawa, Nagano, Japan: (skaters in bold qualify for ISU Junior Grand Prix Final)
Men:  Andrei Rogozine  188.60  Max Aaron  179.82  Abzal Rakimgaliev  172.28
Standings (after 4 of 7 events): Rogozine 30 points (2 events), Aaron 24 (2), Jason Brown  18 (2), Keegan Messing , Yan Han  15 (1), Thomas Sosniak  14 (2), Joshua Farris , Artem Grigoriev  13 (1).
Ladies:  Risa Shoji  149.39  Kiri Baga  138.70  Zhang Kexin  134.08

Football (soccer)
FIFA U-17 Women's World Cup in Trinidad and Tobago:
Third place match:   1–0 
Final:   3–3 (5–4 pen.)  
Korea Republic win their first title in any worldwide FIFA competition.
WAFF Championship in Amman, Jordan:
Group C:  2–1

Gymnastics
World Rhythmic Gymnastics Championships in Moscow, Russia:
Groups all-around:   55.525   54.800   52.425

Korfball
Europa Cup first round in Wrocław, Poland:
Pool A:
AZS Wrocław  23–4  St Andrews University
Ceské Budějovice  15–16  Vacarisses
St Andrews University  2–27  Trojans
Vacarisses  20–10  AZS Wrocław
Ceské Budějovice  11–10  Trojans
Pool B:
SKK Prievidza  12–10  Kocaeli University
CC Oeiras  21–6  Bonson FJEP	
Kocaeli University  7–19  KV Adler Rauxel
Bonson FJEP  5–9  SKK Prievidza
CC Oeiras  13–9  KV Adler Rauxel

Mixed martial arts
UFC 119 in Indianapolis:
Heavyweight bout: Frank Mir  def. Mirko Filipović  by KO (knee)
Light Heavyweight bout: Ryan Bader  def. Antônio Rogério Nogueira  by unanimous decision (30–27, 30–27, 30–27)
Welterweight bout: Chris Lytle  def. Matt Serra  by unanimous decision (30–27, 30–27, 30–27)
Lightweight bout: Sean Sherk  def. Evan Dunham  by split decision (29–28, 28–29, 29–28)
Lightweight bout: Melvin Guillard  def. Jeremy Stephens  by split decision (29–28, 28–29, 30–27)

Pitch and putt
EPPA European Championship in Lloret de Mar, Catalonia:
5th-8th places:
 3–6 
 9–0 
Semifinals:
 8–1 
 8–1

Rugby league
NRL finals series:
Preliminary Final: St. George Illawarra Dragons 13–12 Wests Tigers

Snooker
World Open in Glasgow, Scotland, Quarterfinals:
Mark Williams  3–2 Ding Junhui 
Peter Ebdon  3–1 Martin Gould 
Ronnie O'Sullivan  3–1 Stephen Maguire 
Ricky Walden  1–3 Neil Robertson

Tennis
WTA Tour:
Tashkent Open in Tashkent, Uzbekistan:
Final: Alla Kudryavtseva  def. Elena Vesnina  6–4, 6–4
Kudryavtseva win the first title of her career.

Volleyball
Men's World Championship in Italy:
Pool A in Milan:
 3–0 
 3–0 
Pool B in Verona:
 3–0 
 2–3 
Pool C in Modena:
 3–0 
 1–3 
Pool D in Reggio Calabria:
 0–3 
 3–2 
Pool E in Turin:
 3–2 
 3–0 
Pool F in Trieste:
 3–0 
 0–3 
Final Four Women's Cup in Tuxtla Gutiérrez, Chiapas, Mexico:
Bronze medal match:  0–3  
Final:   2–3  
Dominican Republic win the title for the first time.
Asian Women's Cup Championship in Taicang, China:
7th place playoff:  3–0 
5th place playoff:  3–2 
3rd place playoff:  0–3  
Final:   3–0  
China win the title for the second time.

Weightlifting
World Championships in Antalya, Turkey:
Women's +75 kg:
Total:  Tatiana Kashirina  315 kg   Meng Suping  310 kg  Jang Mi-Ran  309 kg
Snatch:  Kashirina 145 kg (WR)  Meng 131 kg  Jang 130 kg
Clean & Jerk:  Meng 179 kg  Jang 179 kg  Kashirina 170 kg
Men's 94 kg:
Total:  Alexandr Ivanov  403 kg   Artem Ivanov  402 kg  Valeriu Calancea  397 kg
Snatch:  Ivanov 185 kg  Ivanov 185 kg  Vladimir Sedov  180 kg
Clean & Jerk:  Calancea 220 kg  Ivanov 218 kg  Andrey Demanov  218 kg

September 24, 2010 (Friday)

American football
NCAA:
AP Top 10: (4) TCU 41, SMU 24

Basketball
FIBA World Championship for Women in the Czech Republic: (teams in bold advance to the main round)
Group A in Ostrava:
 61–65 
 83–59 
Standings (after 2 games): Australia 4 points, Belarus, Canada 3, China 2.
Group B in Ostrava:
 108–52 
 69–55 
Standings (after 2 games): USA, France 4 points, Greece, Senegal 2.
Group C in Brno:
 84–69 
 80–73 
Standings (after 2 games): Spain 4 points, Korea Republic, Brazil 3, Mali 2.
Group D in Brno:
 58–59 
 55–52 
Standings (after 2 games): Russia 4 points, Japan, Czech Republic 3, Argentina 2.

Figure skating
ISU Junior Grand Prix in Karuizawa, Nagano, Japan:
Ice Dance – short dance: (1) Ekaterina Pushkash / Jonathan Guerreiro  53.91 (2) Alexandra Stepanova / Ivan Bukin  53.28 (3) Geraldine Bott / Neil Brown  52.02
Men – short program: (1) Max Aaron  66.28 (2) Andrei Rogozine  65.03 (3) Abzal Rakimgaliev  61.65
Ladies – short program: (1) Risa Shoji  51.42 (2) Kiri Baga  50.09 (3) Angela Wang  47.61

Football (soccer)
WAFF Championship in Amman, Jordan:
Group A:  3–0 
Group B:  1–1

Gymnastics
World Rhythmic Gymnastics Championships in Moscow, Russia:
Individual all-around:  Yevgeniya Kanayeva  116.250  Daria Kondakova  113.825  Melitina Staniouta  110.350

Korfball
Europa Cup first round in Wrocław, Poland:
Pool A:
Vacarisses  25–5  St Andrews University
Trojans  18–7  AZS Wrocław
Pool B:
KV Adler Rauxel  9–7  SKK Prievidza Dolphins
Bonson FJEP  11–12  Kocaeli University

Pitch and putt
EPPA European Championship in Lloret de Mar, Catalonia: (teams in bold advance to semifinals)
Quarterfinals:
 9–0 
 7–2 
 7–2 
 4.5–4.5

Rugby league
NRL finals series:
Preliminary Final: Gold Coast Titans 6–32 Sydney Roosters

Snooker
World Open in Glasgow, Scotland, Last 16:
Jamie Cope  1–3 Ricky Walden 
Stephen Hendry  1–3 Ronnie O'Sullivan 
Stephen Maguire  3–0 Alan McManus 
Neil Robertson  3–2 Andrew Higginson 
Stephen Lee  0–3 Martin Gould

Volleyball
Final Four Women's Cup in Tuxtla Gutiérrez, Chiapas, Mexico:
Semifinals:
 3–0 
 3–0 
Asian Women's Cup Championship in Taicang, China:
5th–8th semifinals:
 0–3 
 0–3 
Semifinals:
 3–2 
 3–0

Weightlifting
World Championships in Antalya, Turkey:
Men's 85 kg:
Total:  Adrian Zieliński  383 kg   Aleksey Yufkin  380 kg  Siarhei Lahun  377 kg
Snatch:  Ara Khachatryan  175 kg  Zieliński 173 kg  Yufkin 172 kg
Clean & Jerk:  Lahun 211 kg  Yoelmis Hernández  210 kg  Zieliński 210 kg

September 23, 2010 (Thursday)

Basketball
FIBA World Championship for Women in Czech Republic:
Group A in Ostrava:
 68–57 
 47–72 
Group B in Ostrava:
 73–99 
 45–83 
Group C in Brno:
 61–60 
 36–80 
Group D in Brno:
 63–86 
 67–53

Cricket
ICC Intercontinental Cup in Harare, day 4:
 465 (134.5 overs) and 151/4 (54 overs);  590 (173.2 overs). Match drawn.
Standings:  77 points (5 matches), Zimbabwe XI 72 (5),  69 (5), Ireland 55 (6),  43 (5),  15 (6),  9 (6).

Football (soccer)
Copa Sudamericana second stage, second leg: (first leg scores in parentheses)
Emelec  5–0 (1–2)  Universidad San Martín. 3–3 on points; Emelec win 6–2 on aggregate.
Unión San Felipe  1–1 (1–1)  Guaraní. 2–2 on points; 2–2 on aggregate; Unión San Felipe win 8–7 on penalty shootout.
Caracas  0–0 (1–2)  Santa Fe. Santa Fe win 4–1 on points.
CONCACAF Champions League Group Stage, matchday 4: (teams in strike are eliminated)
Group B: Joe Public  2–3  Municipal
Standings (after 4 matches):  Columbus Crew 9 points,  Santos Laguna 7, Municipal 5, Joe Public 1.
Group D: Olimpia  2–1  Toluca
Standings (after 4 matches): Toluca, Olimpia 7 points,  Puerto Rico Islanders 5,  FAS 2.
 Women's Professional Soccer Super Semifinal in Boston:
Boston Breakers 1–2 (a.e.t.) Philadelphia Independence

Gymnastics
World Rhythmic Gymnastics Championships in Moscow, Russia:
Ball:  Yevgeniya Kanayeva  28.700 points  Daria Dmitrieva  28.650  Aliya Garayeva  27.550
Ribbon:  Dmitrieva 28.825 points  Daria Kondakova  28.750  Garayeva 26.675
Teams:   284.925 points   269.700   265.225

Snooker
World Open in Glasgow, Scotland:
Last 32:
Ronnie O'Sullivan  3–1 Jimmy White 
Marco Fu  1–3 Andrew Higginson 
Last 16:
Ding Junhui  3–0 Marcus Campbell 
Mark Williams  3–2 Barry Hawkins 
Peter Ebdon  3–2 Liu Song

Volleyball
Final Four Women's Cup in Tuxtla Gutiérrez, Chiapas, Mexico:
Preliminary Round:
 1–3 
 3–0 
Final standings: Peru 6 points, Dominican Republic 5, Argentina 4, Mexico 3.
Asian Women's Cup Championship in Taicang, China:
Quarterfinals:
 3–0 
 3–0 
 3–0 
 3–0

Weightlifting
World Championships in Antalya, Turkey:
Women's 75 kg:
Total:  Svetlana Podobedova  295 kg (WR)  Natalya Zabolotnaya  293 kg  Nadezhda Yevstyukhina  283 kg
Snatch:  Podobedova 134 kg WR  Zabolotnaya 133 kg  Yevstyukhina 123 kg
Clean & Jerk:  Podobedova 161 kg WR  Yevstyukhina 160 kg  Zabolotnaya 160 kg
Men's 77 kg:
Total:  Tigran Gevorg Martirosyan  373 kg   Lü Xiaojun  370 kg  Tarek Yehia  356 kg
Snatch:  Martirosyan 173 kg  Lu 170 kg  Kianoush Rostami  161 kg
Clean & Jerk:  Lu 200 kg  Martirosyan 200 kg  Yehia 161 kg

September 22, 2010 (Wednesday)

Cricket
Pakistan in England:
5th ODI in Southampton:  256/6 (50 overs; Eoin Morgan 107*);  135 (37 overs). England win by 121 runs; win 5-match series 3–2.
ICC Intercontinental Cup in Harare, day 3:
 465 (134.5 overs);  506/6 (148 overs; Sean Williams 178, Keith Dabengwa 140). Zimbabwe XI lead by 41 runs with 4 wickets remaining in the 1st innings.

Football (soccer)
AFC Champions League quarter-finals, second leg: (first leg scores in parentheses)
Pohang Steelers  1–1 (1–2)  Zob Ahan. Zob Ahan win 3–2 on aggregate.
Suwon Samsung Bluewings  2–0 (1–4)  Seongnam Ilhwa Chunma. Seongnam Ilhwa Chunma win 4–3 on aggregate.
Al-Gharafa  4–2 (0–3)  Al-Hilal. Al-Hilal win 5–4 on aggregate.
Al-Shabab  0–1 (2–0)  Jeonbuk Hyundai Motors. Al-Shabab win 2–1 on aggregate.
Copa Sudamericana second stage, second leg: (first leg scores in parentheses)
Estudiantes  1–1 (0–1)  Newell's Old Boys. Newell's Old Boys win 4–1 on points.
Sport Huancayo  2–0 (0–9)  Defensor Sporting. 3–3 on points; Defensor Sporting win 9–2 on aggregate.
San José  4–0 (1–1)  Atlético Huila. San José win 4–1 on points.
CONCACAF Champions League Group Stage, matchday 4:
Group A: Árabe Unido  2–3  Real Salt Lake
Standings (after 4 matches): Real Salt Lake 9 points,  Cruz Azul 7,  Toronto FC 4, Árabe Unido 3.
Group C:
Monterrey  3–2  Seattle Sounders FC
Marathón  2–1  Saprissa
Standings (after 4 matches): Monterrey 12 points, Saprissa, Marathón 6, Seattle Sounders FC 0.
Group D: FAS  0–0  Puerto Rico Islanders
Standings:  Toluca 7 points (3 matches), Puerto Rico Islanders 5 (4),  Olimpia 4 (3), FAS 2 (4).

Golf
World Golf Hall of Fame Class of 2011:
PGA Tour: Ernie Els 
Veterans: Doug Ford , Jock Hutchison /
Lifetime Achievement: George H. W. Bush 
International inductees will be announced in October.

Snooker
World Open in Glasgow, Scotland, Last 32:
Neil Robertson  3–1 David Morris 
Barry Hawkins  3–1 Ken Doherty 
James McBain  0–3 Ricky Walden 
Judd Trump  2–3 Stephen Maguire 
Martin Gould  3–0 Matthew Couch

Squash
Women's World Open in Sharm El Sheikh, Egypt:
Final:  Nicol David  def.  Omneya Abdel Kawy  11–5, 11–8, 11–6
David wins her fifth world title in six years.

Volleyball
Final Four Women's Cup in Tuxtla Gutiérrez, Chiapas, Mexico:
Preliminary Round:
 1–3 
 3–0

Weightlifting
World Championships in Antalya, Turkey:
Women's 69 kg:
Total:  Svetlana Shimkova  256 kg  Kang Yue  253 kg  Meline Daluzyan  251 kg
Snatch:  Shimkova 116 kg  Kang  113 kg  Daluzyan 112 kg
Clean & Jerk:  Shimkova 140 kg  Kang 140 kg  Daluzyan 139 kg

September 21, 2010 (Tuesday)

Baseball
Major League Baseball
The Minnesota Twins become the first team to clinch a postseason berth with a 6–4 home win over the Cleveland Indians, matched with a Chicago White Sox 7–2 loss to the Oakland Athletics in Oakland to win the American League Central Division championship.

Cricket
ICC Intercontinental Cup in Harare, day 2:
 465 (134.5 overs; Andrew White 102, Shingirai Masakadza 5/107);  175/3 (52 overs). Zimbabwe XI trail by 290 runs with 7 wickets remaining in the 1st innings.
ICC Intercontinental Shield in Windhoek, day 4: (teams in bold advance to the final)
 329 (92.1 overs) and 295 (100 overs; Roger Mukasa 121);  609 (179.4 overs) and 16/0 (4 overs). Namibia win by 10 wickets.
Final standings: Namibia 46 points,  37, Uganda 29,  0.

Football (soccer)
FIFA U-17 Women's World Cup in Trinidad and Tobago:
Semifinals:
 2–1 
 1–2 
Copa Sudamericana second stage, second leg: (first leg scores in parentheses)
Cerro Porteño  2–2 (0–1)  Universitario. Universitario win 4–1 on points.
Deportes Tolima  2–0 (0–1)  Oriente Petrolero. 3–3 on points; Deportes Tolima win 2–1 on aggregate.
CONCACAF Champions League Group Stage, matchday 4:
Group A: Cruz Azul  0–0  Toronto FC
Standings: Cruz Azul 7 points (4 matches),  Real Salt Lake 6 (3), Toronto FC 4 (4),  Árabe Unido 3 (3).
Group B: Columbus Crew  1–0  Santos Laguna
Standings: Columbus Crew 9 points (4 matches), Santos Laguna 7 (4),  Municipal 2 (3),  Joe Public 1 (3).

Gymnastics
World Rhythmic Gymnastics Championships in Moscow, Russia:
Rope:  Daria Kondakova  28.750 points  Yevgeniya Kanayeva  28.600  Melitina Staniouta  27.650
Hoop:  Kanayeva 29.200 points  Kondakova 28.900  Aliya Garayeva  27.675

Snooker
World Open in Glasgow, Scotland, Last 32:
Ali Carter  1–3 Mark Williams 
Ding Junhui  3–1 Jimmy Michie 
Stephen Lee  3–2 Nigel Bond 
Stephen Hendry  3–0 Mark Davis 
Peter Ebdon  3–2 Fergal O'Brien

Volleyball
Final Four Women's Cup in Tuxtla Gutiérrez, Chiapas, Mexico:
Preliminary Round:
 0–3 
 0–3

Weightlifting
World Championships in Antalya, Turkey:
Men's 69 kg:
Total:  Liao Hui  358 kg WR  Ninel Miculescu  337 kg  Mete Binay  335 kg
Snatch:  Binay 160 kg  Liao 160 kg  Miculescu 157 kg
Clean & Jerk:  Liao 198 kg WR  Kim Kum Sok  181 kg  Armen Kazaryan  181 kg

September 20, 2010 (Monday)

American football
NFL Monday Night Football Week 2: New Orleans Saints 25, San Francisco 49ers 22

Cricket
Pakistan in England:
4th ODI in London:  265/7 (50 overs);  227 (46.1 overs). Pakistan win by 38 runs; 5-match series level 2–2.
ICC Intercontinental Cup in Harare, day 1:
 340/6 (96 overs); .
ICC Intercontinental Shield in Windhoek, day 3:
 329 (92.1 overs) and 77/2 (22 overs);  609 (179.4 overs). Uganda trail by 203 runs with 8 wickets remaining.

Snooker
World Open in Glasgow, Scotland
Round 3: Mark King  0–3 Ronnie O'Sullivan 
O'Sullivan becomes the first player to compile at least 10 maximum breaks in professional competition.
Last 32:
Matthew Stevens  2–3 Alan McManus 
Joe Jogia  1–3 Liu Song 
Jamie Cope  3–2 Dave Harold 
Mike Dunn  1–3 Marcus Campbell

Tennis
Davis Cup World Group Play-offs, day 4:
 2–3 
Olivier Rochus  def. Peter Luczak  7–6(8), 6–4, 6–7(0), 7–6(2)
Ruben Bemelmans  def. Carsten Ball  7–6(4), 6–3, 6–4

Weightlifting
World Championships in Antalya, Turkey:
Women's 63 kg:
Total:  Maiya Maneza  246 kg  Sibel Şimşek  241 kg  Ouyang Xiaofang  241 kg
Snatch:  Ouyang 112 kg  Şimşek 111 kg  Kim Soo-Kyung  107 kg
Clean & Jerk:  Maneza 143 kg WR  Nísida Palomeque  134 kg  O Jong Ae  130 kg

September 19, 2010 (Sunday)

American football
NFL Week 2:
Pittsburgh Steelers 19, Tennessee Titans 11
Miami Dolphins 14, Minnesota Vikings 10
Atlanta Falcons 41, Arizona Cardinals 7
Cincinnati Bengals 15, Baltimore Ravens 10
Kansas City Chiefs 16, Cleveland Browns 14
Chicago Bears 27, Dallas Cowboys 20
Philadelphia Eagles 35, Detroit Lions 32
Green Bay Packers 34, Buffalo Bills 7
Tampa Bay Buccaneers 20, Carolina Panthers 7
Denver Broncos 31, Seattle Seahawks 14
Oakland Raiders 16, St. Louis Rams 14
Houston Texans 30, Washington Redskins 27 (OT)
The Texans' Matt Schaub and the Redskins' Donovan McNabb become the first pair of quarterbacks to  throw for 400 or more yards in the same game since .
New York Jets 28, New England Patriots 14
San Diego Chargers 38, Jacksonville Jaguars 13
Sunday Night Football: Indianapolis Colts 38, New York Giants 14

Auto racing
Chase for the Sprint Cup:
Sylvania 300 in Loudon, New Hampshire: (1)  Clint Bowyer (Chevrolet; Richard Childress Racing) (2)  Denny Hamlin (Toyota; Joe Gibbs Racing) (3)  Jamie McMurray (Chevrolet; Earnhardt Ganassi Racing)
Drivers' championship standings (after 27 of 36 races): (1) Hamlin 5230 points (2)  Kevin Harvick (Chevrolet; Richard Childress Racing) 5185 (3)  Kyle Busch (Toyota; Joe Gibbs Racing) 5168
Bowyer was docked 150 points on September 22 after his team was found to be in violation of three rules, dropping him back to 12th in the Chase standings with 5045 points. (NASCAR)
IndyCar Series:
Indy Japan 300 in Motegi, Japan: (1) Hélio Castroneves  (Team Penske) (2) Dario Franchitti  (Chip Ganassi Racing) (3) Will Power  (Team Penske)
Drivers' championship standings (after 16 of 17 races): (1) Power 587 points (2) Franchitti 575 (3) Castroneves 501
World Touring Car Championship:
Race of Spain:
Race 17: (1) Gabriele Tarquini  (SR-Sport; SEAT León) (2) Yvan Muller  (Chevrolet; Chevrolet Cruze) (3) Rob Huff  (Chevrolet; Chevrolet Cruze)
Race 18: (1) Tiago Monteiro  (SR-Sport; SEAT León) (2) Muller (3) Tarquini
Drivers' championship standings (after 18 of 22 races): (1) Muller 265 points (2) Andy Priaulx  (BMW Team RBM; BMW 320si) 240 (3) Tarquini 236
Manufacturers' championship standings: (1) Chevrolet 569 points (2) SEAT Customers Technology 524  (3) BMW 491

Badminton
BWF Super Series:
China Masters Super Series in Changzhou:
Men's singles: Lin Dan  def. Chen Long  21–15, 13–21, 21–14
Women's singles: Wang Xin  def. Tine Baun  21–13, 21–9
Men's doubles: Cai Yun/Fu Haifeng  def. Ko Sung Hyun/Yoo Yeon Seong  21–14, 21–19
Women's doubles: Wang Xiao Li/Yu Yang  def. Bao Yi Xin/Lu Lu  21–8, 21–8
Mixed doubles: Tao Jia Ming/Tian Qing  def. Xu Chen/Yu Yang  21–11, 21–14

Cricket
ICC Intercontinental Shield in Windhoek, day 2:
 329 (92.1 overs);  320/4 (109 overs). Namibia trail by 9 runs with 6 wickets remaining in the 1st innings.

Cycling
Grand Tours:
Vuelta a España:
Stage 21:  Tyler Farrar  2h 02' 24"  Mark Cavendish   s.t.  Allan Davis  s.t.
Final general classification: (1) Vincenzo Nibali   87h 18' 31" (2) Ezequiel Mosquera  + 43" (3) Peter Velits  + 3' 04"
UCI World Rankings (after 25 of 26 events): (1) Joaquim Rodríguez  551 points (2) Alberto Contador  482 (3) Luis León Sánchez  403

Equestrianism
Show jumping:
FEI Nations Cup Promotional League:
Final in Barcelona (CSIO 5*):   (Andreas Schou on Uno's Safier, Emilie Martinsen on Caballero, Thomas Sandgaard on Rubber Ball, Tina Lund on Zamiro)   (Alfredo Fernandez Duran on Gold Digger, Cristina Toda on Cashmire, Natalia Golding on Just Cruising, Jesus Garmendia Echevarria on Moon Mail)   (Jenna Thompson on Zeke, Yann Candele on Atlete van't Heike, Keean White on Celena Z, Ian Millar on Star Power)
Denmark qualify for the 2011 Meydan FEI Nations Cup.
FEI World Cup North American League – East Coast:
6th competition in Moreland Hills, Ohio (CSI 2*-W):  Beezie Madden  on Coral Reef Via Volo  Brianne Goutal  on Onira  Margie Engle  on Indigo
CHI Donaueschingen (CSI 3*):
S.D. Fürst Joachim zu Fürstenberg-Gedächtnispreis (Grand Prix):  Steve Guerdat  on Jalisca Solier  Rolf-Göran Bengtsson  on Quintero  Thomas Mühlbauer  on Asti Spumante
Dressage:
CHI Donaueschingen (CDI 4*):
Grand Prix Spécial:  Victoria Max-Theurer  on Augustin OLD  Anky van Grunsven  on Painted Black  Sabine Becker  on Lamarc WRT

Football (soccer)
CAF Champions League group stage, matchday 6: (teams in bold advance to the semifinals)
Group B:
Heartland  1–1  JS Kabylie
Ismaily  4–2  Al-Ahly
Final standings: JS Kabylie 14 points, Al-Ahly 8, Ismaily 6, Heartland 5.
CAF Confederation Cup group stage, matchday 4:
Group A: Djoliba  2–0  Al-Hilal
Standings (after 4 matches): Al-Hilal,  Ittihad 9 points, Djoliba 4,  ASFAN 1.
Group B: Haras El Hodood  1–2  FUS Rabat
Standings (after 4 matches): FUS Rabat 9 points,  CS Sfaxien 7,  Zanaco 4, Haras El Hodood 2.
 Women's Professional Soccer Playoffs – First Round in West Chester, Pennsylvania:
Philadelphia Independence 1–0 (a.e.t.) Washington Freedom

Gaelic football
All-Ireland Senior Championship Final in Dublin:
Cork  0-16–0-15  Down
Cork win their seventh All-Ireland football title, and first since 1990.

Golf
European Tour:
Austrian Golf Open in Oberwaltersdorf, Austria
Winner: José Manuel Lara  271 (−17)PO
Lara claims his second career European Tour title in a playoff with David Lynn .

Motorcycle racing
Moto GP:
Aragon motorcycle Grand Prix in Alcañiz, Spain:
MotoGP: (1) Casey Stoner  (Ducati) (2) Dani Pedrosa  (Honda) (3) Nicky Hayden  (Ducati)
Riders' championship standings (after 13 of 18 rounds): (1) Jorge Lorenzo  (Yamaha) 284 points (2) Pedrosa 228 (3) Stoner 155
Manufacturers' championship standings: (1) Yamaha 293 points (2) Honda 265 (3) Ducati 195
Moto2: (1) Andrea Iannone  (Speed Up) (2) Julián Simón  (Suter) (3) Gábor Talmácsi  (Speed Up)
Riders' championship standings (after 12 of 17 rounds): (1) Toni Elías  (Moriwaki) 224 points (2) Simón 148 (3) Iannone 144
Manufacturers' championship standings: (1) Moriwaki 249 points (2) Suter 216 (3) Speed Up 169
125cc: (1) Pol Espargaró  (Derbi) (2) Nicolás Terol  (Aprilia) (3) Bradley Smith  (Aprilia)
Riders' championship standings (after 12 of 17 rounds): (1) Terol 208 points (2) Espargaró 202 (3) Marc Márquez  (Derbi)
Manufacturers' championship standings: (1) Derbi 285 points (2) Aprilia 251 (3) Honda 17

Table tennis
European Championships in Ostrava, Czech Republic:
Men's singles final:  Timo Boll  def.  Patrick Baum  4–0
Boll wins the title for the fourth time.
Women's singles final:  Viktoria Pavlovich  def.  Liu Jia  4–3
Women's doubles final:  Rūta Paškauskienė /Oksana Fadeyeva  def.  Li Jie /Elena Timina  4–0

Tennis
Davis Cup World Group Semifinals, day 3: (teams in bold advance to the 2010 final)
 5–0 
Gilles Simon  def. Eduardo Schwank  7–6(5), 6–7(6), 6–3
Arnaud Clément  def. Horacio Zeballos  7–5, 6–1
 3–2 
Novak Djokovic  def. Tomáš Berdych  4–6, 6–3, 6–2, 6–4
Janko Tipsarević  def. Radek Štěpánek  6–0, 7–6(6), 6–4
Serbia reach the final for the first time.
Davis Cup World Group Play-offs, day 3: (teams in bold advance to the 2011 World Group)
 2–3 
Jürgen Melzer  def. Dudi Sela  6–4, 6–0, 6–3
Martin Fischer  def. Harel Levy  2–6, 6–3, 6–0, 6–3
 1–3 
Mardy Fish  def. Santiago Giraldo  3–6, 6–3, 7–5, 4–6, 8–6
Carlos Salamanca  vs. Ryan Harrison  not played
 5–0 
Andreas Beck  def. Izak van der Merwe  7–5, 6–2
Florian Mayer  def. Rik de Voest  6–3, 6–7(8), 6–2
 3–2 
Robin Söderling  def. Simone Bolelli  6–3, 6–3, 6–3
Fabio Fognini  def. Andreas Vinciguerra  6–1, 6–3
 3–2 
Somdev Devvarman  def. Thomaz Bellucci  7–6(3), 4–0 retired
Rohan Bopanna  def. Ricardo Mello  6–3, 7–6(2), 6–3
 2–1 
Peter Luczak  vs. Olivier Rochus  4–4 (match suspended)
 5–0 
Andrey Golubev  def. Michael Lammer  6–3, 6–2
Mikhail Kukushkin  def. Marco Chiudinelli  6–2, 6–4
 5–0 
Victor Crivoi  def. Giovanni Lapentti  6–2, 6–4
Adrian Ungur  def. Emilio Gómez  6–3, 6–4
WTA Tour:
Guangzhou International Women's Open:
Final: Jarmila Groth  def. Alla Kudryavtseva  6–1, 6–4
Groth wins the first WTA title of her career.
Bell Challenge:
Final: Tamira Paszek  def. Bethanie Mattek-Sands  7–6(6), 2–6, 7–5
Paszek wins her first WTA title of the season and the second of her career.

Weightlifting
World Championships in Antalya, Turkey:
Women's 58 kg:
Total:  Deng Wei  237 kg  Nastassia Novikava  233 kg  Jong Chun Mi  230 kg
Snatch:  Pak Hyon Suk  103 kg  Novikava 103 kg  Deng 102 kg
Clean & Jerk:  Deng 135 kg  Jong 130 kg  Novikava 130 kg
Men's 62 kg:
Total:  Kim Un Guk  320 kg  Zhang Jie  315 kg  Erol Bilgin  314 kg
Snatch:  Kim 147 kg  Bilgin 143 kg  Ding Jianjun  142 kg
Clean & Jerk:  Zhang 174 kg  Kim 173 kg  Eko Yuli Irawan  172 kg

September 18, 2010 (Saturday)

American football
NCAA:
AP Top 10:
(1) Alabama 62, Duke 13
(2) Ohio State 43, Ohio 7
(3) Boise State 51, Wyoming 6
(4) TCU 45, Baylor 10
(5) Oregon 69, Portland State 0
(6) Texas 24, Texas Tech 14
(7) Oklahoma 27, Air Force 24
(8) Nebraska 56, Washington 21
(24) Arizona 34, (9) Iowa 27
(10) Florida 31, Tennessee 17
Other games: UCLA 31, (23) Houston 13

Australian rules football
AFL finals series:
Second Preliminary Final in Melbourne:  13.10 (88)–8.16 (64)

Cricket
ICC Intercontinental Shield in Windhoek, day 1:
 329 (92.1 overs; Laurence Sematimba 106, Craig Williams 5/90); .
Clydesdale Bank 40 Final in London:
Somerset 199 (39 overs; Imran Tahir 5/41); Warwickshire 200/7 (39 overs; Ian Bell 107). Warwickshire win by 3 wickets.

Cycling
Grand Tours:
Vuelta a España:
Stage 20:  Ezequiel Mosquera  4h 45' 28"  Vincenzo Nibali   + 1"  Joaquim Rodríguez   + 23"
General classification: (1) Nibali  85h 16' 05" (2) Mosquera + 41" (3) Peter Velits  + 3' 02"

Figure skating
ISU Junior Grand Prix in Graz, Austria:
Men:  Yan Han  170.48  Artem Grigoriev  166.04  Zhan Bush  164.56
Standings (after 3 of 7 events): Keegan Messing , Andrei Rogozine , Yan  15 points (1 event), Thomas Sosniak  14 (2), Jason Brown , Joshua Farris , Grigoriev 13 (1), Max Aaron , Keiji Tanaka , Bush 11 (1).
Ladies:  Adelina Sotnikova  178.97  Christina Gao  167.14  Li Zijun  144.76
Standings (after 3 of 7 events): Rosa Sheveleva  16 points (2 events), Sotnikova, Polina Shelepen , Elizaveta Tuktamysheva  15 (1), Gao, Yasmin Siraj , Kristiene Gong  13 (1), Li, Shion Kokubun  11 (1).

Football (soccer)
CAF Champions League group stage, matchday 6: (teams in bold advance to the semifinals)
Group A:
Dynamos  0–1  Espérance ST
ES Sétif  0–0  TP Mazembe
Final standings: Espérance ST 13 points, TP Mazembe 11, ES Sétif 6, Dynamos 3.
CAF Confederation Cup group stage, matchday 4:
Group A: ASFAN  1–3  Ittihad
Standings:  Al-Hilal 9 points (3 matches), Ittihad 9 (4), ASFAN 1 (4),  Djoliba 1 (3).

Rugby league
NRL finals series:
Semi-Final: Sydney Roosters 34–12 Penrith Panthers

Table tennis
European Championships in Ostrava, Czech Republic:
Men's doubles final:  Timo Boll/Christian Süss  def.  Kasper Sternberg/Jonathan Groth  4–0
Boll and Süss win the title for the fourth successive time.

Tennis
Davis Cup World Group Semifinals, day 2: (teams in bold advance to the 2010 final)
 3–0 
Arnaud Clément/Michaël Llodra  def. Eduardo Schwank/Horacio Zeballos  6–4, 7–5, 6–3
France reach the final for the first time since 2002.
 1–2 
Tomáš Berdych/Radek Štěpánek  def. Novak Djokovic/Nenad Zimonjić  3–6, 6–1, 6–4, 6–1
Davis Cup World Group Play-offs, day 2: (teams in bold advance to the 2011 World Group)
 1–2 
Mardy Fish/John Isner  def. Robert Farah/Carlos Salamanca  6–4, 6–4, 6–7(5), 6–3
 3–0 
Andreas Beck/Christopher Kas  def. Rik de Voest/Wesley Moodie  6–4, 3–6, 6–3, 6–4
 2–1 
Simon Aspelin/Robert Lindstedt  def. Simone Bolelli/Potito Starace  5–7, 6–7(0), 7–6(4), 6–3, 7–5
 1–2 
Mahesh Bhupathi/Leander Paes  def. Marcelo Melo/Bruno Soares  6–4, 7–6(5), 6–1
 2–1 
Paul Hanley/Lleyton Hewitt  def. Ruben Bemelmans/Olivier Rochus  6–1, 6–2, 6–4
 3–0 
Andrey Golubev/Yuri Schukin  def. Yves Allegro/Stanislas Wawrinka  6–4, 6–3, 6–3
Kazakhstan advance to the World Group for the first time.
 3–0 
Victor Hănescu/Horia Tecău  vs. Iván Endara/Giovanni Lapentti  6–2, 6–2, 6–2

Weightlifting
World Championships in Antalya, Turkey:
Women's 53 kg:
Total:  Chen Xiaoting  222 kg  Aylin Daşdelen  211 kg  Yudelquis Contreras  206 kg
Snatch:  Chen 100 kg  Maridalin 93 kg  Daşdelen 90 kg
Clean & Jerk:  Chen 122 kg  Daşdelen 121 kg  Hiromi Miyake  113 kg
Men's 56 kg:
Total:  Wu Jingbiao  292 kg  Long Qingquan  288 kg  Cha Kum Chol  280 kg
Snatch:  Wu 132 kg  Cha 130 kg  Long 127 kg
Clean & Jerk:  Long 161 kg  Wu 160 kg  Carlos Berna  152 kg

September 17, 2010 (Friday)

Australian rules football
AFL finals series:
First Preliminary Final in Melbourne:  18.12 (120)–11.13 (79)

Baseball
Major League Baseball news: Joe Torre announces he will step down as manager of the Los Angeles Dodgers at the end of this season. Dodgers first-base coach and former New York Yankees star Don Mattingly has been named as his replacement. (ESPN)

Cricket
Pakistan in England:
3rd ODI in London:  241 (49.4 overs);  218 (45.4 overs; Umar Gul 6/42). Pakistan win by 23 runs; England lead 5-match series 2–1.

Cycling
Grand Tours:
Vuelta a España:
Stage 19:  Philippe Gilbert  5h 43' 41"  Tyler Farrar  s.t.  Filippo Pozzato  + 1"
General classification: (1) Vincenzo Nibali   80h 30' 48" (2) Ezequiel Mosquera  + 50" (3) Peter Velits  + 1' 59"

Figure skating
ISU Junior Grand Prix in Graz, Austria:
Ice Dance:  Charlotte Lichtman / Dean Copley  129.96  Victoria Sinitsina / Ruslan Zhiganshin  126.62  Gabriella Papadakis / Guillaume Cizeron  115.14
Standings (after 3 of 7 events): Papadakis / Cizeron 20 points (2 events), Ksenia Monko / Kirill Khaliavin , Lichtman / Copely, Alexandra Stepanova / Ivan Bukin  15 (1), Sinitsina / Zhiganshin, Anastasia Galyeta / Alexei Shumski , Anastasia Cannuscio / Colin McManus  13 (1), Lauri Bonacorsi / Travis Mager , Evgenia Kosigina / Nikolai Moroshkin  11 (1).
Pairs:  Ksenia Stolbova / Fedor Klimov  159.79  Sui Wenjing / Han Cong  145.67  Yu Xiaoyu / Jin Yang  135.04
Ladies – short program: (1) Adelina Sotnikova  61.32 (2) Christina Gao  58.07 (3) Polina Agafonova  51.50

Football (soccer)
FIFA U-17 Women's World Cup in Trinidad and Tobago:
Quarterfinals:
 2–1 
 2–1 
CAF Confederation Cup group stage, matchday 4:
Group B: CS Sfaxien  2–1  Zanaco
Standings: CS Sfaxien 7 points (4 matches),  FUS Rabat 6 (3), Zanaco 4 (4),  Haras El Hodood 2 (3).

Rugby league
NRL finals series:
Semi-Final: Canberra Raiders 24–26 Wests Tigers

Tennis
Davis Cup World Group Semifinals, day 1:
 2–0 
Michaël Llodra  def. Juan Mónaco  7–5, 4–6, 7–5, 6–3
Gaël Monfils  def. David Nalbandian  6–4, 2–6, 6–4, 6–3
 1–1 
Radek Štěpánek  def. Viktor Troicki  4–6, 6–2, 6–4, 6–4
Janko Tipsarević  def. Tomáš Berdych  7–5, 6–2, 2–6, 7–6(5)
Davis Cup World Group Play-offs, day 2:
 2–1 
Jonathan Erlich/Andy Ram  def. Jürgen Melzer/Alexander Peya  7–6(2), 6–4, 6–4
Davis Cup World Group Play-offs, day 1:
 1–1 
Mardy Fish  def. Alejandro Falla  4–6, 6–1, 6–4, 3–6, 6–4
Santiago Giraldo  def. Sam Querrey  6–2, 6–4, 7–5
 2–0 
Philipp Kohlschreiber  def. Rik de Voest  6–4, 6–4, 6–4
Florian Mayer  def. Izak van der Merwe  6–3, 3–6, 6–1, 7–6(6)
 1–1 
Potito Starace  def. Andreas Vinciguerra  6–2, 6–2, 6–2
Robin Söderling  def. Fabio Fognini  6–1, 6–3, 6–2
 0–2 
Thomaz Bellucci  def. Rohan Bopanna  6–7(2), 7–6(7), 7–5, 4–6, 10–8
Ricardo Mello  def. Somdev Devvarman  4–6, 6–2, 6–7(3), 6–2, 6–4
 1–1 
Lleyton Hewitt  def. Ruben Bemelmans  7–6(4), 7–5, 2–6, 6–4
Olivier Rochus  def. Carsten Ball  6–4, 6–4, 7–6(5)
 2–0 
Andrey Golubev  def. Marco Chiudinelli  6–4, 6–4, 6–4
Mikhail Kukushkin  def. Stanislas Wawrinka  3–6, 6–1, 6–4, 1–6, 6–3
 2–0 
Victor Hănescu  def. Iván Endara  6–2, 6–2, 6–2
Adrian Ungur  def. Giovanni Lapentti  6–7(2), 4–6, 6–3, 6–4, 6–1

Weightlifting
World Championships in Antalya, Turkey:
Women's 48 kg:
Total:  Nurcan Taylan  214 kg  Sibel Özkan  205 kg  Tian Yuan  204 kg
Snatch:  Taylan 93 kg  Özkan 90 kg  Tian 88 kg
Clean & Jerk:  Taylan 121 kg (WR)  Tian 116 kg  Özkan 115 kg

September 16, 2010 (Thursday)

Basketball
WNBA Playoffs:
WNBA Finals, Game 3: Seattle Storm 87, Atlanta Dream 84. Storm win series 3–0.
The Storm win their second WNBA title. Storm center and season MVP Lauren Jackson is named Finals MVP, becoming the first non-U.S. player ever to win the latter award.

Cricket
 County Championship:
Division One:
Durham 286 (89.5 overs) and 320 (110.4 overs; Michael Di Venuto 129); Somerset 426 (100.1 overs; James Hildreth 105) and 48/3 (12 overs). Match drawn.
Nottinghamshire 400/9d (89.4 overs; Adam Voges 126, Simon Kerrigan 5/80); Lancashire 11/3 (4.4 overs). Match drawn.
Yorkshire 261 (76.3 overs; Dewald Nel 6/62) and 130 (29.5 overs; James Tredwell 7/22); Kent 302 (81.5 overs; Alex Blake 105*, Moin Ashraf 5/32) and 90/6 (24.5 overs). Kent win by 4 wickets.
Final standings: Nottinghamshire, Somerset 214 points, Yorkshire 203.
Nottinghamshire win the title for the sixth time, winning seven games to Somerset's six.

Cycling
Grand Tours:
Vuelta a España:
Stage 18:  Mark Cavendish   3h 27' 11"  Juan José Haedo  s.t.  Manuel Antonio Cardoso  s.t.
General classification: (1) Vincenzo Nibali   74h 47' 06" (2) Ezequiel Mosquera  + 38" (3) Peter Velits  + 1' 59"

Figure skating
ISU Junior Grand Prix in Graz, Austria:
Ice Dance – short dance: (1) Charlotte Lichtman / Dean Copley  53.38 (2) Victoria Sinitsina / Ruslan Zhiganshin  50.46 (3) Gabriella Papadakis / Guillaume Cizeron  49.93
Pairs – short program: (1) Ksenia Stolbova / Fedor Klimov  54.30 (2) Sui Wenjing / Han Cong  51.87 (3) Yu Xiaoyu / Jin Yang  47.03
Men – short program: (1) Artem Grigoriev  63.44 (2) Fumiya Itai  59.03 (3) Zhan Bush  54.64

Football (soccer)
2011 FIFA Women's World Cup qualification (UEFA):
Play-offs, second leg: (first leg in parentheses, winners qualify for 2011 FIFA Women's World Cup)
 2–2 (a.e.t.) (1–2) . Sweden win 4–3 on aggregate.
Sweden qualify for the World Cup for the sixth straight time.
 2–3 (0–2) . England win 5–2 on aggregate.
England qualify for the World Cup for the third time.
FIFA U-17 Women's World Cup in Trinidad and Tobago:
Quarterfinals:
 5–6 (a.e.t.) 
 0–1 
UEFA Europa League group stage, matchday 1:
Group A:
Red Bull Salzburg  0–2  Manchester City
Juventus  3–3  Lech Poznań
Group B:
Aris  1–0  Atlético Madrid
Bayer Leverkusen  4–0  Rosenborg
Group C:
Lille  1–2  Sporting CP
Levski Sofia  3–2  Gent
Group D:
Dinamo Zagreb  2–0  Villarreal
Club Brugge  1–1  PAOK
Group E:
AZ  2–1  Sheriff Tiraspol
Dynamo Kyiv  2–2  BATE
Group F:
Sparta Prague  3–2  Palermo
Lausanne-Sport  0–3  CSKA Moscow
Group G:
Anderlecht  1–3  Zenit St. Petersburg
AEK Athens  3–1  Hajduk Split
Group H:
Stuttgart  3–0  Young Boys
Getafe  2–1  Odense
Group I:
Debrecen  0–5  Metalist Kharkiv
PSV Eindhoven  1–1  Sampdoria
Group J:
Karpaty Lviv  3–4  Borussia Dortmund
Sevilla  0–1  Paris Saint-Germain
Group K:
Napoli  0–0  Utrecht
Liverpool  4–1  Steaua București
Group L:
Beşiktaş  1–0  CSKA Sofia
Porto  3–0  Rapid Wien
Copa Sudamericana second stage, first leg:
Newell's Old Boys  1–0  Estudiantes
Defensor Sporting  9–0  Sport Huancayo
Santa Fe  2–1  Caracas
CONCACAF Champions League Group Stage, matchday 3:
Group D: Olimpia  2–0  FAS
Standings (after 3 matches):  Toluca 7 points,  Puerto Rico Islanders, Olimpia 4, FAS 1.

Snooker
Premier League Snooker – League phase in Plymouth:
Mark Selby  2–4 Mark Williams 
Ronnie O'Sullivan  3–3 Ding Junhui 
Standings: O'Sullivan 2 points (2 matches), Shaun Murphy , Williams 2 (1), Ding 1 (2), Marco Fu  1 (1), Selby 0 (1), Neil Robertson  0 (0).

Tennis
Davis Cup World Group Play-offs, day 1:
 1–1 
Dudi Sela  def. Andreas Haider-Maurer  6–4, 6–1, 6–3
Jürgen Melzer  def. Harel Levy  6–4, 6–3, 6–3

September 15, 2010 (Wednesday)

Cycling
Grand Tours:
Vuelta a España:
Stage 17:  Peter Velits  52' 43"  Denis Menchov  + 12"  Fabian Cancellara  + 37"
General classification: (1) Vincenzo Nibali   71h 19' 50" (2) Ezequiel Mosquera  + 38" (3) Velits + 1' 59"

Football (soccer)
2011 FIFA Women's World Cup qualification (UEFA):
Play-offs, second leg: (first leg in parentheses, winners qualify for 2011 FIFA Women's World Cup)
 2–3 (0–0) . France win 3–2 on aggregate.
France qualify for the World Cup for the second time.
 2–0 (1–0) . Norway win 3–0 on aggregate.
Norway qualify for the World Cup for the sixth successive time.
UEFA Champions League group stage, matchday 1:
Group E:
Bayern Munich  2–0  Roma
CFR Cluj  2–1  Basel
Group F:
Marseille  0–1  Spartak Moscow
Žilina  1–4  Chelsea
Group G:
Real Madrid  2–0  Ajax
Milan  2–0  Auxerre
Group H:
Arsenal  6–0  Braga
Shakhtar Donetsk  1–0  Partizan
AFC Champions League quarter-finals, first leg:
Jeonbuk Hyundai Motors  0–2  Al-Shabab
Seongnam Ilhwa Chunma  4–1  Suwon Samsung Bluewings
Zob Ahan  2–1  Pohang Steelers
Al-Hilal  3–0  Al-Gharafa
Copa Sudamericana second stage, first leg:
Universidad San Martín  2–1  Emelec
Copa Sudamericana second stage, second leg: (first leg scores in parentheses)
Banfield  1–1 (1–0)  Vélez Sársfield. Banfield win 4–1 on points.
CONCACAF Champions League Group Stage, matchday 3:
Group A:
Árabe Unido  0–6  Cruz Azul
Real Salt Lake  4–1  Toronto FC
Standings (after 3 matches): Cruz Azul, Real Salt Lake 6 points, Toronto FC, Árabe Unido 3.
Group D: Toluca  3–0  Puerto Rico Islanders
Standings: Toluca 7 points (3 matches), Puerto Rico Islanders 4 (3),  FAS,  Olimpia 1 (2).

Table tennis
European Championships in Ostrava, Czech Republic:
Men's team final:   3–0  
Germany win the title for the fourth successive time.
Women's team final:   3–1  
The Netherlands win the title for the third successive time.

September 14, 2010 (Tuesday)

American football
After his involvement in a scandal that led to severe sanctions on the USC football program, Reggie Bush announces that he will forfeit his 2005 Heisman Trophy. (ESPN)

Basketball
WNBA Playoffs:
WNBA Finals, Game 2: Seattle Storm 87, Atlanta Dream 84. Storm lead series 2–0.

Football (soccer)
UEFA Champions League group stage, matchday 1:
Group A:
Twente  2–2  Internazionale
Werder Bremen  2–2  Tottenham Hotspur
Group B:
Lyon  1–0  Schalke 04
Benfica  2–0  Hapoel Tel Aviv
Group C:
Manchester United  0–0  Rangers
Bursaspor  0–4  Valencia
Group D:
Barcelona  5–1  Panathinaikos
Copenhagen  1–0  Rubin Kazan
Copa Sudamericana second stage, first leg:
Oriente Petrolero  1–0  Deportes Tolima
Copa Sudamericana second stage, second leg: (first leg scores in parentheses)
Peñarol  2–1 (1–0)  Barcelona. Peñarol win 6–0 on points.
CONCACAF Champions League Group Stage, matchday 3:
Group B:
Columbus Crew  3–0  Joe Public
Municipal  2–2  Santos Laguna
Standings (after 3 matches): Santos Laguna 7 points, Columbus Crew 6, Municipal 2, Joe Public 1.
Group C:
Monterrey  2–0  Marathón
Saprissa  2–0  Seattle Sounders FC
Standings (after 3 matches): Monterrey 9 points, Saprissa 6, Marathón 3, Seattle Sounders FC 0.

Table tennis
European Championships in Ostrava, Czech Republic:
Men's team semifinals:
 3–1 
 3–1 
Women's team semifinals:
 3–0 
 3–0

September 13, 2010 (Monday)

American football
NFL Monday Night Football Week 1:
Baltimore Ravens 10, New York Jets 9
The Jets lose their first regular-season game at New Meadowlands Stadium.
Kansas City Chiefs 21, San Diego Chargers 14

Cycling
Grand Tours:
Vuelta a España:
Stage 16:  Mikel Nieve  4h 51' 59"  Fränk Schleck  + 1' 06"  Kevin De Weert  + 1' 08"
General classification: (1) Joaquim Rodríguez   70h 24' 39" (2) Vincenzo Nibali  + 33" (3) Ezequiel Mosquera  + 53"

Football (soccer)
FIFA U-17 Women's World Cup in Trinidad and Tobago: (teams in bold advance to the quarterfinals)
Group C:
 6–0  New Zealand
 1–2 
Final standings: Spain 9 points, Japan 6, Venezuela 3, New Zealand 0.
Group D:
 0–3 
 2–0 
Final standings: Republic of Ireland, Brazil 6 points, Canada, Ghana 3.

Judo
World Judo Championships in Tokyo, Japan:
Men's Open Category:  Daiki Kamikawa   Teddy Riner   Keiji Suzuki  and Hiroki Tachiyama 
Women's Open Category:  Mika Sugimoto   Qin Qian   Tea Donguzashvili  and Megumi Tachimoto

Tennis
Grand Slams:
US Open in New York City, United States, day 15:
Men's singles, final: Rafael Nadal  [1] def. Novak Djokovic  [3] 6–4, 5–7, 6–4, 6–2
Nadal wins his first US Open, and ninth Grand Slam in total. In doing so, Nadal becomes the seventh man to complete a career Grand Slam, and the second to complete a career Golden Slam.
Women's doubles, final: Vania King  / Yaroslava Shvedova  [6] def. Liezel Huber  / Nadia Petrova  [2] 2–6, 6–4, 7–6(4)
King and Shvedova win their second consecutive women's doubles Grand Slam title.

September 12, 2010 (Sunday)

American football
NFL Week 1:
New York Giants 31, Carolina Panthers 18
The Giants win the first regular-season game at New Meadowlands Stadium.
Pittsburgh Steelers 15, Atlanta Falcons 9 (OT)
Tampa Bay Buccaneers 17, Cleveland Browns 14
Jacksonville Jaguars 24, Denver Broncos 17
Houston Texans 34, Indianapolis Colts 24
Miami Dolphins 15, Buffalo Bills 10
Chicago Bears 19, Detroit Lions 14
Tennessee Titans 38, Oakland Raiders 13
New England Patriots 38, Cincinnati Bengals 24
Arizona Cardinals 17, St. Louis Rams 13
Seattle Seahawks 31, San Francisco 49ers 6
Green Bay Packers 27, Philadelphia Eagles 20
Sunday Night Football: Washington Redskins 13, Dallas Cowboys 7

Auto racing
Formula One:
 in Monza, Italy: (1) Fernando Alonso  (Ferrari) (2) Jenson Button  (McLaren–Mercedes) (3) Felipe Massa  (Ferrari)
Drivers' championship standings (after 14 of 19 races): (1) Mark Webber  (Red Bull–Renault) 187 points (2) Lewis Hamilton  (McLaren-Mercedes) 182 (3) Alonso 166
Constructors' championship standings: (1) Red Bull 350 points (2) McLaren 347 (3) Ferrari 290
V8 Supercars:
L&H 500 in Phillip Island (Victoria): (1) Craig Lowndes /Mark Skaife  (Holden Commodore) (2) Mark Winterbottom /Luke Youlden  (Ford Falcon) (3) Jason Richards /Andrew Jones  (Holden Commodore)
Drivers' championship standings (after 17 of 26 races): (1) James Courtney  (Ford Falcon) 2101 points (2) Jamie Whincup  (Holden Commodore) 1922 (3) Winterbottom 1862
World Rally Championship:
Rally Japan in Hokkaidō: (1) Sébastien Ogier /Julien Ingrassia  (Citroën C4 WRC) (2) Petter Solberg /Chris Patterson  (Citroën C4 WRC) (3) Jari-Matti Latvala /Miikka Anttila  (Ford Focus RS WRC 09)
Drivers' championship standings (after 10 of 13 rounds): (1) Sébastien Loeb  (Citroën C4 WRC) 201 points (2) Ogier 158 (3) Latvala 132

Basketball
FIBA World Championship in Istanbul, Turkey:
5th place playoff:  81–86 
3rd place playoff:  88–99  
Final:   64–81  
The USA win their fourth world title.
WNBA Playoffs:
WNBA Finals, Game 1: Seattle Storm 79, Atlanta Dream 77. Storm lead series 1–0.

Canoeing
Slalom World Championships in Ljublijana, Slovenia:
Women's C-1:  Jana Dukátová   Leanne Guinea   Jessica Fox 
Men's C-1:  Tony Estanguet   Michal Martikán   Jordi Domenjó 
Men's K-1:  Daniele Molmenti   Vavřinec Hradilek   Jure Meglič 
Men's C-1 team:      
Men's K-1 team:

Cricket
Pakistan in England:
2nd ODI in Leeds:  294/8 (50 overs);  295/6 (49.3 overs; Andrew Strauss 126). England win by 4 wickets; lead 5-match series 2–0.

Cue sports
World Cup of Pool:
Semifinals:
Fu Jianbo/Li Hewen  9–7 Ralf Souquet/Oliver Ortmann 
Roberto Gomez/Dennis Orcollo  9–8 Ko Pin-yi/Chang Jung-lin 
Final: Fu/Li 10–5 Gomez/Orcollo

Cycling
Grand Tours:
Vuelta a España:
Stage 15:  Carlos Barredo  4h 33' 09"  Nico Sijmens  + 1' 07"  Martin Velits  + 1' 43"
General classification: (1) Vincenzo Nibali   65h 31' 14" (2) Joaquim Rodríguez   + 4" (3) Ezequiel Mosquera  + 39"
UCI ProTour:
GP de Montréal:  Robert Gesink  4h 58' 22"  Peter Sagan  + 4"  Ryder Hesjedal  + 4"
UCI World Rankings (after 24 of 26 events): (1) Alberto Contador  482 points (2) Rodríguez 428 (3) Cadel Evans  390

Equestrianism
Show jumping:
Spruce Meadows Masters in Calgary (CSIO 5*):
CN International Grand Prix:  Jeroen Dubbeldam  on Simon  Richard Spooner  on Cristallo  Eric Lamaze  on Hickstead
HITS-on-the-Hudson Horse Show, Saugerties, New York:
Pfizer $1m Grand Prix:  McLain Ward  on Sapphire  Charlie Jayne  on Athena  John Pearce  on Chianto

Football (soccer)
2011 FIFA Women's World Cup qualification (UEFA):
Play-offs, first leg:
 2–0 
FIFA U-17 Women's World Cup in Trinidad and Tobago: (teams in bold advance to the quarterfinals)
Group A:
 1–0 
 0–5 
Final standings: Nigeria 9 points, Korea DPR 6, Trinidad and Tobago 3, Chile 0.
Group B:
 0–3 
 4–0 
Final standings: Germany 9 points, Korea Republic 6, Mexico 3, South Africa 0.
CAF Champions League group stage, matchday 5: (teams in bold advance to the semifinals)
Group A: TP Mazembe  2–1  Dynamos
Standings (after 5 matches):  Espérance ST, TP Mazembe 10 points,  ES Sétif 5, Dynamos 3.
Group B: Al-Ahly  2–1  Heartland
Standings (after 5 matches):  JS Kabylie 13 points, Al-Ahly 8, Heartland 4,  Ismaily 3.
CAF Confederation Cup group stage, matchday 3:
Group A: Ittihad  4–0  ASFAN
Standings (after 3 matches):  Al-Hilal 9 points, Ittihad 6,  Djoliba, ASFAN 1.
Group B: FUS Rabat  1–0  Haras El Hodood
Standings (after 3 matches): FUS Rabat 6 points,  CS Sfaxien,  Zanaco 4, Haras El Hodood 2.

Golf
PGA Tour:
FedEx Cup Playoffs: BMW Championship in Lemont, Illinois:
Winner: Dustin Johnson  275 (−9)
Johnson wins his second PGA Tour title of the season and fourth of his career.
European Tour:
KLM Open in Hilversum, Netherlands:
Winner: Martin Kaymer  266 (−14)
Kaymer wins his second European Tour title of the season and seventh of his career.
LPGA Tour:
P&G NW Arkansas Championship in Rogers, Arkansas:
Winner: Yani Tseng  200 (−13)
Tseng wins her third LPGA Tour title of the season, and fifth of her career.
Champions Tour:
Posco E&C Songdo Championship in Songdo, South Korea:
Winner: Russ Cochran  204 (−12)PO
Cochran wins his first Champions Tour title on the first hole of a playoff with fellow American Fred Funk.

Judo
World Judo Championships in Tokyo, Japan:
Men's 66 kg:   Junpei Morishita   Leandro Cunha   Khashbaataryn Tsagaanbaatar  and Loic Korval 
Men's 60 kg:  Rishod Sobirov   Georgii Zantaraia   Arsen Galstyan  and Hiroaki Hiraoka 
Women's 52 kg:  Yuka Nishida   Misato Nakamura   Natalia Kuzyutina  and Mönkhbaataryn Bundmaa 
Women's 48 kg:  Haruna Asami   Tomoko Fukumi   Alina Alexandra Dumitru  and Sarah Menezes

Rowing
European Championships in Montemor-o-Velho, Portugal:
Men:
M2-:      
M2x:      
M4-:      
M1x:      
LM2x:      
LM4-:      
M4x:      
M8+:      
Women:
W2-:      
W2x:      
W1x:      
LW2x:      
W4x:      
W8+:

Rugby league
NRL finals series:
Qualifying Finals: St. George Illawarra Dragons 28–0 Manly-Warringah Sea Eagles

Snooker
Shanghai Masters:
Final: Jamie Burnett  7–10 Ali Carter 
Carter wins the second ranking title of his career.

Tennis
Grand Slams:
US Open in New York City, United States, day 14:
Men's singles, final: Rafael Nadal  [1] vs. Novak Djokovic  [3]. Postponed to September 13 due to rain.
Women's doubles, final: Vania King  / Yaroslava Shvedova  [6] vs. Liezel Huber  / Nadia Petrova  [2] 2–6, 6–4, 4–5 (match suspended)

Wrestling
World Championships in Moscow, Russia:
Men's freestyle 66 kg:  Sushil Kumar   Alan Gogayev   Jabrail Hasanov  and Geandry Garzón 
Men's freestyle 74 kg:  Denis Tsargush   Sadegh Goudarzi   Gábor Hatos  and bdulkhakim Shapiyev 
Men's freestyle 120 kg:  Beylal Makhov   Artur Taymazov   Levan Berianidze  and Ioannis Arzoumanidis

September 11, 2010 (Saturday)

American football
NCAA:
AP Top 10:
(1) Alabama 24, (18) Penn State 3
(2) Ohio State 36, (12) Miami 24
(4) TCU 62, Tennessee Tech 7
(5) Texas 34, Wyoming 7
(6) Nebraska 38, Idaho 17
(7) Oregon 48, Tennessee 13
(8) Florida 38, South Florida 14
(9) Iowa 35, Iowa State 7
(10) Oklahoma 47, (17) Florida State 17
Other games:
James Madison 21, (13) Virginia Tech 16
Kansas 28, (15) Georgia Tech 25
(24) South Carolina 17, (22) Georgia 6
Idle: (3) Boise State

Australian rules football
AFL finals series:
First Semi-final in Melbourne:  11.11 (77)–10.12 (72)

Auto racing
NASCAR Sprint Cup Series:
Air Guard 400 in Richmond, Virginia: (1)  Denny Hamlin (Toyota; Joe Gibbs Racing) (2)  Kyle Busch (Toyota; Joe Gibbs Racing) (3)  Jimmie Johnson (Chevrolet; Hendrick Motorsports)
Drivers qualifying for the Chase for the Sprint Cup — points through 26 races, followed by points entering the Chase in parentheses:
  Kevin Harvick (Chevrolet; Richard Childress Racing) 3723 points (5030)
 Kyle Busch 3495 (5030)
  Jeff Gordon (Chevrolet; Hendrick Motorsports) 3493 (5000)
  Carl Edwards (Ford; Roush Fenway Racing) 3427 (5000)
 Johnson 3417 (5050)
  Tony Stewart (Chevrolet; Stewart Haas Racing) 3417 (5010)
  Jeff Burton (Chevrolet; Richard Childress Racing) 3390 (5000)
  Matt Kenseth (Ford, Roush Fenway Racing) 3346 (5000)
 Hamlin 3342 (5060)
  Kurt Busch (Dodge; Penske Racing) 3337 (5020)
  Clint Bowyer (Chevrolet; Richard Childress Racing) 3221 (5000)
  Greg Biffle (Ford; Roush Fenway Racing) 3177 (5010)

Basketball
FIBA World Championship in Istanbul, Turkey:
7th place playoff:  78–83 
Semifinals:
 82–83 
 89–74

Canoeing
Slalom World Championships in Ljublijana, Slovenia:
Men's C-2:  Pavol Hochschorner/Peter Hochschorner   Denis Gargaud Chanut/Fabien Lefèvre   David Florence/Richard Hounslow 
Women's K-1:  Corinna Kuhnle   Jana Dukátová   Violetta Oblinger-Peters 
Men's C-2 team:      
Women's K-1 team:

Cue sports
World Cup of Pool in Manila, Philippines:
Quarterfinals:
Muhammad Zulfikri/Ricky Yang  3–9 Fu Jianbo/Li Hewen 
Ralf Souquet/Oliver Ortmann  9–7 Stephan Cohen/François Cottance 
Roberto Gomez/Dennis Orcollo  9–1 Mika Immonen/Markus Juva 
Ko Pin-yi/Chang Jung-lin  9–5 Radosław Babica/Mariusz Skoneczny

Cycling
Grand Tours:
Vuelta a España:
Stage 14:  Joaquim Rodríguez  4h 26' 43"  Vincenzo Nibali  + 20"  Ezequiel Mosquera  + 22"
General classification: (1) Nibali  60h 55' 39" (2) Rodríguez  + 4" (3) Mosquera + 50"

Equestrianism
Show jumping:
2011 FEI Nations Cup Promotional League North and South America:
Nations Cup of Canada in Calgary (CSIO 5*):   (Rich Fellers on Flexible, Ashlee Bond on Cadett, Richard Spooner on Cristallo, Beezie Madden on Coral Reef Via Volo)   (Trevor Breen on Adventure de Kannan, Nicola Fitzgibbon on Puissance, David Quigley on Ulot, Shane Sweetnam on Amaretto D'Arco)   (John Anderson on Terrific, Jonathon Millar on Contino, Yann Candele on Pitareusa, Eric Lamaze on Hickstead)
FEI World Cup North American League – East Coast:
5th competition in Saugerties, New York (CSI 2*-W):  McLain Ward  on Rothchild  John Pearce  on Son of a Gun  Saer Coulter  on Chalan

Field hockey
Women's World Cup in Rosario, Argentina:
3rd place playoff:   2–0 
Final:   1–3  
Argentina win the title for the second time, repeating their 2002 final victory over the Netherlands.

Figure skating
ISU Junior Grand Prix in Brașov, Romania:
Men:  Keegan Messing  187.38 points  Joshua Farris  179.22  Keiji Tanaka  166.48
Standings (after 2 of 7 events): Messing, Andrei Rogozine  15 points (1 event), Thomas Sosniak  14 (2), Jason Brown , Farris 13 (1), Max Aaron , Tanaka 11 (1).
Ice Dance:  Ksenia Monko / Kirill Khaliavin  138.27 points  Anastasia Galyeta / Alexei Shumski  124.65  Lauri Bonacorsi / Travis Mager  110.58
Standings (after 2 of 7 events): Monko/Khaliavin, Alexandra Stepanova/Ivan Bukin  15 points (1 event), Galyeta/Shumski, Anastasia Cannuscio/Colin McManus  13 (1), Bonacorsi/Mager, Evgenia Kosigina/Nikolai Moroshkin  11 (1).

Football (soccer)
2011 FIFA Women's World Cup qualification (UEFA):
Play-offs, first leg:
 2–1 
 0–1 
 0–0 
CAF Champions League group stage, matchday 5: (teams in bold advance to the semifinals)
Group A: Espérance ST  2–2  ES Sétif
Standings: Espérance ST 10 points (5 matches),  TP Mazembe 7 (4), ES Sétif 5 (5),  Dynamos 3 (4).
CAF Confederation Cup group stage, matchday 3:
Group B: Zanaco  1–0  CS Sfaxien
Standings: CS Sfaxien, Zanaco 4 points (3 matches),  FUS Rabat 3 (2),  Haras El Hodood 2 (2).

Horse racing
English Triple Crown:
St. Leger Stakes in Doncaster, South Yorkshire:  Arctic Cosmos (trainer: John Gosden, jockey: William Buick)  Midas Touch (trainer: Aidan O'Brien, jockey: Colm O'Donoghue)  Corsica (trainer: Mark Johnston, jockey: Joe Fanning)

Judo
World Judo Championships in Tokyo, Japan:
Men's 73 kg:  Hiroyuki Akimoto   Dex Elmont   Wang Ki-chun  and Yasuhiro Awano 
Women's 63 kg:  Yoshie Ueno   Miki Tanaka   Yaritza Abel  and Ramila Yusubova 
Women's 57 kg:  Kaori Matsumoto   Telma Monteiro   Sabrina Filzmoser  and Ioulietta Boukouvala

Rowing
European Championships in Montemor-o-Velho, Portugal:
Men:
M2+:      
LM1x:      
LM2-:      
LM4x:      
LM8+:      
Women:
W4-:    
LW1x:      
LW4x:

Rugby league
NRL finals series:
Qualifying Finals:
Wests Tigers 15–19 Sydney Roosters
Penrith Panthers 22–24 Canberra Raiders

Rugby union
Tri Nations Series:
 22–23  in Sydney
Final standings: New Zealand 27 points, Australia 11,  8.
The All Blacks win all six games, the first side to do so in a single Tri Nations series.

Snooker
Shanghai Masters, Semifinal:
Jamie Burnett  6–1 Jamie Cope 
Ali Carter  6–2 Mark Selby

Tennis
Grand Slams:
US Open in New York City, United States, day 13:
Men's singles, semifinals:
Rafael Nadal  [1] def. Mikhail Youzhny  [12] 6–2, 6–3, 6–4
Novak Djokovic  [3] def. Roger Federer  [2] 5–7, 6–1, 5–7, 6–2, 7–5
Women's singles, final: Kim Clijsters  [2] def. Vera Zvonareva  [7] 6–2, 6–1
Clijsters defends her title, winning the third US Open – and Grand Slam – singles title of her career.

Volleyball
The 109-match winning streak of the Penn State women's team ends with a straight-set defeat to Stanford in a tournament in Florida. The streak was the longest in NCAA women's volleyball history, and the second-longest in the history of Division I team sports. (AP via ESPN)

Water polo
Men's European Championship in Zagreb, Croatia:
Bronze medal match:   10–8 
Final:   7–3  
Croatia win the title for the first time.

Wrestling
World Championships in Moscow, Russia:
Men's freestyle 60 kg:  Besik Kudukhov   Vasyl Fedoryshyn   Morad Mohammadi  and Zelimkhan Huseynov 
Men's freestyle 84 kg:  Mihail Ganev   Zaurbek Sokhiev   Soslan Ktsoyev  and Reineris Salas 
Men's freestyle 96 kg:  Khetag Gazyumov   Khadjimourat Gatsalov   Aleksey Krupnyakov  and Georgi Gogshelidze

September 10, 2010 (Friday)

Australian rules football
AFL finals series:
Second Semi-final in Melbourne:  20.15 (135)–10.6 (66)

Auto racing
Nationwide Series:
Virginia 529 College Savings 250 in Richmond, Virginia: (1)  Kevin Harvick (Chevrolet; Kevin Harvick Inc.) (2)  Brad Keselowski (Dodge; Penske Racing) (3)  Trevor Bayne (Toyota; Diamond-Waltrip Racing)
Drivers' championship standings (after 27 of 35 races): (1) Keselowski 4302 points (2)  Carl Edwards (Ford; Roush Fenway Racing) 3929 (3)  Kyle Busch (Toyota; Joe Gibbs Racing) 3719

Basketball
FIBA World Championship in Istanbul, Turkey:
5th–8th place semifinals:
 97–80 
 61–73

Cricket
Pakistan in England:
1st ODI in Chester-le-Street:  274/6 (41/41 overs);  250/9 (41 overs). England win by 24 runs; lead 5-match series 1–0.

Cycling
Grand Tours:
Vuelta a España:
Stage 13:  Mark Cavendish   4h 50' 18"  Thor Hushovd  s.t.  Daniele Bennati  s.t.
General classification: (1) Igor Antón   56h 28' 03" (2) Vincenzo Nibali  + 45" (3) Xavier Tondó  + 1' 04"
UCI ProTour:
GP de Québec:  Thomas Voeckler  4h 35' 26"  Edvald Boasson Hagen  + 2"  Robert Gesink  + 2"
UCI World Rankings (after 23 of 26 events): (1) Alberto Contador  482 points (2) Joaquim Rodríguez  428 (3) Cadel Evans  390

Equestrianism
Show jumping:
Spruce Meadows Masters in Calgary (CSIO 5*):
ENCANA Cup:  Rik Hemeryck  on Quarco de Kerambars  Beezie Madden  on Mademoiselle  Werner Muff  on Quax II

Field hockey
Women's World Cup in Rosario, Argentina:
9th place playoff:  4–3 
7th place playoff:  3–0 
5th place playoff:  2–1

Figure skating
ISU Junior Grand Prix in Brașov, Romania:
Ice Dance – short dance: (1) Ksenia Monko / Kirill Khaliavin  55.22 (2) Anastasia Galyeta / Alexei Shumski  47.66 (3) Tiffany Zahorski / Alexis Miart  46.98
Ladies:  Elizaveta Tuktamysheva  132.32  Kristiene Gong  130.10  Shion Kokubun  128.78
Standings (after 2 of 7 events): Rosa Sheveleva  16 points (2 events), Polina Shelepen , Tuktamysheva 15 (1), Yasmin Siraj , Gong 13 (1), Kokubun 11 (1).

Football (soccer)
CAF Champions League group stage, matchday 5: (teams in bold advance to the semifinals)
Group B: JS Kabylie  1–0  Ismaily
Standings: JS Kabylie 13 points (5 matches),  Al-Ahly 5 (4),  Heartland 4 (3), Ismaily 3 (5).
CAF Confederation Cup group stage, matchday 3:
Group A: Al-Hilal  2–1  Djoliba
Standings: Al-Hilal 9 points (3 matches),  Al-Ittihad 3 (2),  ASFAN 1 (2), Djoliba 1 (3).

Judo
World Judo Championships in Tokyo, Japan:
Men's 90 kg:  Ilias Iliadis   Daiki Nishiyama   Elkhan Mammadov  and Kirill Denisov 
Men's 81 kg:  Kim Jae-Bum   Leandro Guilheiro   Masahiro Takamatsu  and Euan Burton 
Women's 70 kg:  Lucie Décosse   Anett Meszaros   Yoriko Kunihara  and Raša Sraka

Rugby league
NRL finals series:
Qualifying Finals: Gold Coast Titans 28–16 New Zealand Warriors

Snooker
Shanghai Masters, Quarterfinals:
Jamie Burnett  5–4 Mark Davis 
Graeme Dott  2–5 Jamie Cope 
Ali Carter  5–4 Matthew Stevens 
Mark Selby  5–1 Mark King

Tennis
Grand Slams:
US Open in New York City, United States, day 12:
Women's singles, semifinals:
Vera Zvonareva  [7] def. Caroline Wozniacki  [1] 6–4, 6–3
Kim Clijsters  [2] def. Venus Williams  [3] 4–6, 7–6(2), 6–4
Men's doubles, final: Bob Bryan /Mike Bryan  [1] def. Rohan Bopanna /Aisam-ul-Haq Qureshi  [16] 7–6(5), 7–6(4)
The Bryans win their third US Open and ninth Grand Slam men's doubles title.

Water polo
Men's European Championship in Zagreb, Croatia:
9th place playoff:  10–7 
7th place playoff:  7–8 
5th place playoff:  6–14 
Women's European Championship in Zagreb, Croatia:
Bronze Medal Match:  12–14  
Final:   6–11  
Russia win the title for the third successive time.

Wrestling
World Championships in Moscow, Russia:
Women's freestyle 67 kg:  Martine Dugrenier   Yelena Shalygina   Ifeoma Iheanacho  and Alla Cherkasova 
Women's freestyle 72 kg:  Stanka Zlateva   Ohenewa Akuffo   Ekaterina Bukina  and Kyoko Hamaguchi 
Men's freestyle 55 kg:   Viktor Lebedev   Toghrul Asgarov   Frank Chamizo  and Yasuhiro Inaba

September 9, 2010 (Thursday)

American football
NFL Week 1:
Kickoff game: New Orleans Saints 14, Minnesota Vikings 9

Basketball
FIBA World Championship in Istanbul, Turkey:
Quarterfinals:
 89–79 
 104–85

Cycling
Grand Tours:
Vuelta a España:
Stage 12:  Mark Cavendish  4h 00' 30"  Tyler Farrar  s.t.  Matthew Goss  s.t.
General classification: (1) Igor Antón   51h 37' 45" (2) Vincenzo Nibali  + 45" (3) Xavier Tondó  + 1' 04"

Field hockey
Women's World Cup in Rosario, Argentina:
Semifinals:
 1–1 (4–3 pen.) 
 2–1 
11th place playoff:  2–1

Figure skating
ISU Junior Grand Prix in Brașov, Romania:
Ladies – short program: (1) Yuki Nishino  48.98 points (2) Rosa Sheveleva  47.54 (3) Kristiene Gong  47.08
Men – short program: (1) Joshua Farris  67.03 points (2) Keegan Messing  65.33 (3) Keiji Tanaka  57.98

Football (soccer)
FIFA U-17 Women's World Cup in Trinidad and Tobago:
Group C:
New Zealand  1–3 
 6–0 
Standings (after 2 matches): Spain 6 points, Japan, Venezuela 3, New Zealand 0.
Group D:
 1–0 
 1–0 
Standings (after 2 matches): Brazil, Republic of Ireland, Canada, Ghana 3 points.
Copa Sudamericana second stage, first leg:
Universitario  1–0  Cerro Porteño
Copa Sudamericana second stage, second leg: (first leg scores in parentheses)
Argentinos Juniors  1–1 (0–1)  Independiente. Independiente win 4–1 on points.

Judo
World Judo Championships in Tokyo, Japan:
Men's +100 kg:  Teddy Riner   Andreas Tölzer   Matthieu Bataille  and Islam El Shehaby 
Men's 100 kg:  Takamasa Anai   Henk Grol   Oreidis Despaigne  and Thierry Fabre 
Women's +78 kg:  Mika Sugimoto   Qin Qian   Idalys Ortiz  and Maki Tsukada 
Women's 78 kg:  Kayla Harrison   Mayra Aguiar   Akari Ogata  and Yang Xiuli

Snooker
Shanghai Masters, Last 16:
Jamie Burnett  5–0 Andrew Higginson 
Mark Davis  5–3 Stephen Maguire  (5)
Mark Williams  (7) 4–5 Graeme Dott  (12)
Jamie Cope  (16) 5–1 Ding Junhui  (4)
Ali Carter  (3) 5–3 Stuart Bingham 
Matthew Stevens  5–2 Shaun Murphy  (6)
Mark Selby  (8) 5–4 Martin Gould 
Mark King  (14) 5–3 Peter Ebdon

Tennis
Grand Slams:
US Open in New York City, United States, day 11:
Men's singles, quarterfinals:
Rafael Nadal  [1] def. Fernando Verdasco  [8] 7–5, 6–3, 6–4
Mikhail Youzhny  [12] def. Stanislas Wawrinka  [25] 3–6, 7–6(7), 3–6, 6–3, 6–3
Mixed doubles, final: Liezel Huber /Bob Bryan  [1] def. Květa Peschke /Aisam-ul-Haq Qureshi  6–4, 6–4
Huber wins her second mixed doubles Grand Slam title, and Bryan wins his seventh.

Water polo
Men's European Championship in Zagreb, Croatia:
Semifinals:
 9–10 
 10–8 
7th–12th Semifinals:
 12–11 (2OT) 
 8–15 
11th place playoff:  5–4

Wrestling
World Championships in Moscow, Russia:
Women's freestyle 55 kg:  Saori Yoshida   Yuliya Ratkevich   Anna Gomis  and Tatiana Padilla 
Women's freestyle 59 kg:  Soronzonboldiin Battsetseg   Zhang Lan   Ayako Shoda  and Johanna Mattsson 
Women's freestyle 63 kg:  Kaori Icho   Elena Pirozhkova   Hanna Johansson  and Lubov Volosova

September 8, 2010 (Wednesday)

Basketball
FIBA World Championship in Istanbul, Turkey:
Quarterfinals:
 92–89 
 68–95

Cycling
Grand Tours:
Vuelta a España:
Stage 11:  Igor Antón  5h 25' 44"  Ezequiel Mosquera  + 3"  Xavier Tondó  + 10"
General classification: (1) Antón  47h 37' 15" (2) Vincenzo Nibali  + 45" (3) Tondó + 1' 04"

Football (soccer)
FIFA U-17 Women's World Cup in Trinidad and Tobago: (teams in bold advance to the quarter-finals)
Group A:
 3–0 
 1–2 
Standings (after 2 matches): Nigeria 6 points, Korea DPR, Trinidad and Tobago 3, Chile 0.
Group B:
 10–1 
 4–1 
Standings (after 2 matches): Germany, Korea Republic 6 points, South Africa, Mexico 0.
Recopa Sudamericana, second leg: (first leg score in parentheses)
Estudiantes  0–0 (1–2)  LDU Quito. LDU Quito win 4–1 on points.
LDU Quito win their second consecutive Recopa.

Snooker
Shanghai Masters, First round:
Neil Robertson  (2) 4–5 Peter Ebdon 
Ali Carter  (3) 5–3 Dave Harold 
Mark Selby  (8) 5–2 Mei Xiwen 
Jamie Cope  (16) 5–3 Steve Davis 
Ding Junhui  (4) 5–4 Jin Long 
Shaun Murphy  (6) 5–3 Stephen Lee 
Stephen Hendry  (10) 2–5 Martin Gould 
Mark King  (14) 5–3 Joe Delaney

Tennis
Grand Slams:
US Open in New York City, United States, day 10:
Men's singles, quarterfinals:
Roger Federer  [2] def. Robin Söderling  [5] 6–4, 6–4, 7–5
Novak Djokovic  [3] def. Gaël Monfils  [17] 7–6(2), 6–1, 6–2
Women's singles, quarterfinals:
Caroline Wozniacki  [1] def. Dominika Cibulková  6–2, 7–5
Vera Zvonareva  [7] def. Kaia Kanepi  [31] 6–3, 7–5

Water polo
Women's European Championship in Zagreb, Croatia:
Semifinals:
 5–10 
 10–7 
5th place playoff:  10–7

Wrestling
World Championships in Moscow, Russia:
Men's Greco-Roman 74 kg:  Selçuk Çebi   Arsen Julfalakyan   Imil Sharafetdinov  and Daniar Kobonov 
Women's freestyle 48 kg:  Hitomi Sakamoto   Larisa Oorzhak   Zhao Shasha  and Carol Huynh 
Women's freestyle 51 kg:  Oleksandra Kohut   Yu Horiuchi   Sofia Mattsson  and Zamira Rakhmanova

September 7, 2010 (Tuesday)

Basketball
FIBA World Championship in Istanbul, Turkey:
Eighth–finals:
 78–67 
 93–89 
WNBA Playoffs:
Eastern Conference Finals, Game 2: (4) Atlanta Dream 105, (2) New York Liberty 93. Dream win series 2–0.

Cricket
Pakistan in England:
2nd T20I in Cardiff:  89 (18.4 overs);  90/4 (14 overs). England win by 6 wickets; win 2-match series 2–0.
Ireland in Canada:
2nd ODI in Toronto:  325/8 (50 overs; Paul Stirling 177);  233 (46.3 overs; Albert van der Merwe 5/49). Ireland win by 92 runs; 2-match series drawn 1–1.

Cycling
Grand Tours:
Vuelta a España:
Stage 10:  Imanol Erviti  4h 13' 31"  Romain Zingle  + 37"  Greg Van Avermaet  + 37"
General classification: (1) Joaquim Rodríguez    42h 11' 49" (2) Igor Antón  + 2" (3) Vincenzo Nibali  + 4"

Field hockey
Women's World Cup in Rosario, Argentina: (teams in bold advance to the semifinals)
Pool A:
 3–0 
 5–2 
 0–1 
Final standings: Netherlands 15 points, Germany 12, Australia 9, New Zealand 4, India 3, Japan 1.

Football (soccer)
UEFA Euro 2012 qualifying:
Group A:
 3–2 
 2–0 
 6–1 
Standings: Germany, Turkey 6 points (2 matches), Austria 3 (1), Belgium 0 (2), Azerbaijan 0 (1), Kazakhstan 0 (2).
Group B:
 0–1 
 2–2 
 3–1 
Standings (after 2 matches): Republic of Ireland, Slovakia 6 points, Russia 3, Armenia, Macedonia 1, Andorra 0.
Group C:
 1–1 
 5–0 
Standings: Italy 6 points (2 matches), Serbia 4 (2),  3 (1),  3 (2), Slovenia 1 (2), Faroe Islands 0 (3).
Group D:
 0–0 
 1–0 
 0–2 
Standings (after 2 matches): Albania, Belarus 4 points, France, Bosnia and Herzegovina 3, Romania 2, Luxembourg 0.
Group E:
 6–0 
 2–1 
 2–1 
Standings (after 2 matches): Sweden, Netherlands 6 points, Hungary, Moldova 3, Finland, San Marino 0.
Group F:
 0–0 
 0–2 
 0–0 
Standings (after 2 matches): Croatia, Israel 4 points, Latvia 3, Georgia, Greece 2, Malta 0.
Group G:
 0–1 
 1–3 
Standings: England, Montenegro 6 points (2 matches), Switzerland 0 (1), Bulgaria 0 (2).
Group H:
 1–0 
 1–0 
Standings: Norway 6 points (2 matches), Denmark 3 (1),  1 (1), Portugal 1 (2), Iceland 0 (2).
Group I:
 0–1 
 2–1 
Standings: Scotland, Lithuania 4 points (2 matches),  3 (1), Czech Republic 0 (1), Liechtenstein 0 (2).
Friendly international match:  4–1 
2011 European Under-21 Championship qualification: (teams in bold advance to the playoffs)
Group 1:
 0–0 
 1–1 
Final standings: Romania 25 points, Russia 22, Moldova 14, Latvia 13,  11,  1.
Group 2:
 0–2 
 1–0 
Final standings:  20 points, Turkey 16, Georgia 15, Armenia 13,  12, Republic of Ireland 7.
Group 3:
 1–0 
 0–0 
Final standings: Italy, Wales 16 points, Hungary 13, Bosnia and Herzegovina 8,  4.
Group 4:
 0–1 
 3–0 
Final standings:  21 points, Spain 19, Finland 10, Poland 9, Liechtenstein 0.
Group 5:
 3–0 
 3–1 
Final standings: Czech Republic 22 points, Iceland 16, Germany 12, Northern Ireland 7,  0.
Group 6:
 5–0 
 0–1 
Final standings: Sweden 19 points, Israel 16, Montenegro 13,  5, Bulgaria 4.
Group 7:
 1–4 
 1–3 
Final standings:  17 points, Slovakia 14, Serbia 13, Norway 7, Cyprus 6.
Group 8:
 2–0 
 0–0 
Final standings: Ukraine 16 points, France 15, Slovenia 8, Malta 0.
Group 9:
 3–0 
 3–1 
Final standings:  19 points, England 17, Portugal 13, Lithuania 5, Macedonia 2.
Group 10:
 2–1 
 1–0 
Final standings: Scotland, Belarus 17 points, Austria 14, Azerbaijan 4.
Copa Sudamericana second stage, first leg:
Atlético Huila  1–1  San Jose
Guaraní  1–1  Unión San Felipe

Golf
Ryder Cup:
United States team captain Corey Pavin selects Tiger Woods, Stewart Cink, Zach Johnson and Rickie Fowler as his four wildcard picks.

Snooker
Shanghai Masters, First round:
Liang Wenbo  (15) 3–5 Matthew Stevens 
Stephen Maguire  (5) 5–3 Judd Trump 
Graeme Dott  (12) 5–4 Ken Doherty 
Mark Allen  (9) 2–5 Stuart Bingham 
Jamie Burnett  def. Ronnie O'Sullivan  (1) walkover
Marco Fu  (13) 4–5 Mark Davis 
Mark Williams  (7) 5–3 Ricky Walden 
Ryan Day  (11) 3–5 Andrew Higginson

Tennis
Grand Slams:
US Open in New York City, United States, day 9:
Men's singles, fourth round:
Rafael Nadal  [1] def. Feliciano López  [23] 6–3, 6–4, 6–4
Fernando Verdasco  [8] def. David Ferrer  [10] 5–7, 6–7(8), 6–3, 6–3, 7–6(4)
Mikhail Youzhny  [12] def. Tommy Robredo  7–5, 6–2, 4–6, 6–4
Stanislas Wawrinka  [25] def. Sam Querrey  [20] 7–6(9), 6–7(5), 7–5, 4–6, 6–4
Women's singles, quarterfinals:
Kim Clijsters  [2] def. Samantha Stosur  [5] 6–4, 5–7, 6–3
Venus Williams  [3] def. Francesca Schiavone  [6] 7–6(5), 6–4

Water polo
Men's European Championship in Zagreb, Croatia:
Quarterfinals:
 6–2 
 5–6 
7th–12th Quarterfinals:
 9–6 
 9–6

Wrestling
World Championships in Moscow, Russia:
Men's Greco-Roman 60 kg:  Hasan Aliyev   Ryutaro Matsumoto   Almat Kebispayev  and Jung Ji-Hyun 
Men's Greco-Roman 84 kg:  Hristo Marinov   Pablo Shorey   Aleksey Mishin  and Nenad Žugaj 
Men's Greco-Roman 120 kg:  Mijaín López   Yuri Patrikeyev   Nurmakhan Tinaliyev  and Rıza Kayaalp

September 6, 2010 (Monday)

American football
NCAA:
AP Top 10: (3) Boise State 33, (10) Virginia Tech 30 in Landover, Maryland
Played earlier this week: (1) Alabama, (2) Ohio State, (4) Florida, (5) Texas, (6) TCU, (7) Oklahoma, (8) Nebraska, (9) Iowa

Basketball
FIBA World Championship in Istanbul, Turkey:
Eighth–finals:
 121–66 
 78–56

Cricket
Ireland in Canada:
1st ODI in Toronto:  175/9 (35/35 overs);  163/4 (33/33 overs). Canada win by 4 runs (D/L); lead 2-match series 1–0.

Field hockey
Women's World Cup in Rosario, Argentina: (teams in bold advance to the semi-finals)
Pool B:
 0–6 
 5–3 
 2–0 
Final standings: Argentina 15 points, England 10, Korea 8, China 6, South Africa 3, Spain 1.

Football (soccer)
FIFA U-17 Women's World Cup in Trinidad and Tobago:
Group C:
 4–1 
New Zealand  1–2 
Group D:
 1–2 
 1–0

Golf
PGA Tour:
FedEx Cup Playoffs: Deutsche Bank Championship in Norton, Massachusetts:
Winner: Charley Hoffman  262 (−22)
Hoffman wins his second PGA Tour title.

Snooker
Shanghai Masters, Wildcard round:
Jamie Burnett  5–2 Tian Pengfei 
Andrew Higginson  5–2 Rouzi Maimaiti 
Ken Doherty  5–4 Mohammad Sajjad 
Robert Milkins  3–5 Jin Long 
Dave Harold  5–1 Passakorn Suwannawat 
Mike Dunn  1–5 Mei Xiwen 
Martin Gould  5–3 Li Hang 
Joe Delaney  5–1 Li Yan

Tennis
Grand Slams:
US Open in New York City, United States, day 8:
Men's singles, fourth round:
Roger Federer  [2] def. Jürgen Melzer  [13] 6–3, 7–6(4), 6–3
Novak Djokovic  [3] def. Mardy Fish  [11] 6–3, 6–4, 6–1
Robin Söderling  [5] def. Albert Montañés  [21] 4–6, 6–3, 6–2, 6–3
Gaël Monfils  [17] def. Richard Gasquet  6–4, 7–5, 7–5
Women's singles, fourth round:
Caroline Wozniacki  [1] def. Maria Sharapova  [14] 6–3, 6–4
Vera Zvonareva  [7] def. Andrea Petkovic  6–1, 6–2
Dominika Cibulková  def. Svetlana Kuznetsova  [11] 7–5, 7–6(4)
Kaia Kanepi  [31] def. Yanina Wickmayer  [15] 0–6, 7–6(2), 6–1

Water polo
Women's European Championship in Zagreb, Croatia:
Quarterfinals:
 12–9 
 9–10 
7th place playoff:  7–23

Wrestling
World Championships in Moscow, Russia:
Men's Greco-Roman 55 kg:  Hamid Sourian   Choi Gyu-Jin   Nazyr Mankiev  and Roman Amoyan 
Men's Greco-Roman 66 kg:  Ambako Vachadze   Armen Vardanyan   Vasıf Arzımanov  and Vitaliy Rahimov 
Men's Greco-Roman 96 kg:  Amir Ali-Akbari   Tsimafei Dzeinichenka   Aslanbek Khushtov  and Jimmy Lidberg

September 5, 2010 (Sunday)

Australian rules football
AFL finals series:
Second Elimination Final in Perth:  14.10 (94)–8.16 (64)

Auto racing
NASCAR Sprint Cup Series:
Emory Healthcare 500 in Hampton, Georgia: (1)  Tony Stewart (Chevrolet, Stewart Haas Racing) (2)  Carl Edwards (Ford, Roush Fenway Racing) (3)  Jimmie Johnson (Chevrolet, Hendrick Motorsports)
Drivers' championship standings (after 25 of 26 races leading to the Chase for the Sprint Cup): (1)  Kevin Harvick (Chevrolet; Richard Childress Racing) 3585 points (2)  Jeff Gordon (Chevrolet; Hendrick Motorsports) 3366 (3)  Kyle Busch (Toyota; Joe Gibbs Racing) 3325
Eight more drivers clinch spots in the Chase: Kyle Busch, Stewart, Edwards, Jeff Burton, Johnson, Kurt Busch, Matt Kenseth, and Denny Hamlin.
World Touring Car Championship:
Race of Germany:
Round 15: (1) Alain Menu  (Chevrolet; Chevrolet Cruze) (2) Augusto Farfus  (BMW Team RBM; BMW 320si) (3) Yvan Muller  (Chevrolet; Chevrolet Cruze)
Round 16: (1) Andy Priaulx  (BMW Team RBM; BMW 320si) (2) Farfus (3) Muller
Drivers' championship standings (after 16 of 22 rounds): (1) Muller 229 points (2) Priaulx 216 (3) Gabriele Tarquini  (SR-Sport; SEAT León) 196
Manufacturers' championship standings: (1) Chevrolet 508 points (2) BMW 451 (3) SEAT Customers Technology 449

Basketball
FIBA World Championship in Istanbul, Turkey:
Eighth–finals:
 87–58 
 95–77 
WNBA Playoffs:
Eastern Conference Finals, Game 1: (4) Atlanta Dream 81, (2) New York Liberty 75. Dream lead series 1–0.
Western Conference Finals, Game 2: (1) Seattle Storm 91, (2) Phoenix Mercury 88. Storm win series 2–0.

Cricket
Pakistan in England:
1st T20I in Cardiff:  126/4 (20 overs);  129/5 (17.1 overs). England win by 5 wickets; lead 2-match series 1–0.

Cycling
Grand Tours:
Vuelta a España:
Stage 9:  David López  5h 20' 51"  Roman Kreuziger  + 6"  Giampaolo Caruso  + 13"
General classification: (1) Igor Antón   37h 56' 42" (2) Joaquim Rodríguez  + 0" (3) Vincenzo Nibali   + 2"

Field hockey
Women's World Cup in Rosario, Argentina: (teams in bold advance to the semifinals)
Pool A:
 0–2 
 1–2 
 1–4 
Standings (after 4 games): Netherlands 12 points, Germany, Australia 9, India 3, Japan, New Zealand 1.

Football (soccer)
FIFA U-17 Women's World Cup in Trinidad and Tobago:
Group A:
 3–2 
 2–1 
Group B:
 9–0 
 1–3 
2012 Africa Cup of Nations qualification, matchday 1:
Group A:  1–1 
Group B:
 1–4 
 2–0 
Group C:
 0–0 
 4–0 
Group E:  2–4 
Group G:  1–1 
Group H:  1–1 
Group I:  0–3

Golf
European Tour:
Omega European Masters in Crans-Montana, Switzerland:
Winner: Miguel Ángel Jiménez  263 (−21)
Jiménez wins his third European Tour title of the season and 18th of his career.
Champions Tour:
Home Care & Hospice First Tee Open at Pebble Beach in Pebble Beach, California:
Winner: Ted Schulz  202 (−14)
Schulz wins for the first time on the senior circuit.

Hurling
All-Ireland Senior Championship Final in Dublin:
Kilkenny  1-18–4-17  Tipperary
Tipperary win their 26th All-Ireland hurling title and their first since 2001. In the process, they prevent Kilkenny from winning a fifth straight All-Ireland title.

Motorcycle racing
Moto GP:
San Marino and Rimini's Coast motorcycle Grand Prix in Misano Adriatico, Italy:
MotoGP: (1) Dani Pedrosa  (Honda) (2) Jorge Lorenzo  (Yamaha) (3) Valentino Rossi  (Yamaha)
Riders' championship standings (after 12 of 18 rounds): (1) Lorenzo 271 points (2) Pedrosa 208 (3) Andrea Dovizioso  (Honda) 139
Manufacturers' championship standings: (1) Yamaha 280 points (2) Honda 245 (3) Ducati 170
Moto2: (1) Toni Elías  (Moriwaki) (2) Julián Simón  (Suter) (3) Thomas Lüthi  (Moriwaki)
Riders' championship standings (after 11 of 17 rounds): (1) Elías 211 points (2) Simón 128 (3) Lüthi 124
Manufacturers' championship standings: (1) Moriwaki 236 points (2) Suter 196 (3) Speed Up 144
Shoya Tomizawa is fatally injured in a crash during the race. He is the first rider killed in a Grand Prix race since Daijiro Kato at the 2003 Japanese Grand Prix. (BBC Sport)
125cc: (1) Marc Márquez  (Derbi) (2) Nicolás Terol  (Aprilia) (3) Efrén Vázquez  (Derbi)
Riders' championship standings (after 11 of 17 rounds): (1) Márquez 197 points (2) Terol 188 (3) Pol Espargaró  (Derbi) 177
Manufacturers' championship standings: (1) Derbi 260 points (2) Aprilia 231 (3) Honda 14
Superbike:
Nürburgring Superbike World Championship round in Nürburg, Germany:
Race 1: (1) Jonathan Rea  (Honda CBR1000RR) (2) Carlos Checa  (Ducati 1098R) (3) Cal Crutchlow  (Yamaha YZF-R1)
Race 2: (1) Noriyuki Haga  (Ducati 1098R) (2) Rea (3) Leon Haslam  (Suzuki GSX-R1000)
Riders' championship standings (after 11 of 13 rounds): (1) Max Biaggi  (Aprilia RSV 4) 397 points (2) Haslam 339 (3) Rea 288
Manufacturers' championship standings: (1) Aprilia 409 points (2) Suzuki 360 (3) Ducati 342
Supersport:
Nürburgring Supersport World Championship round in Nürburg, Germany: (1) Eugene Laverty  (Honda CBR600RR) (2) Kenan Sofuoğlu  (Honda CBR600RR) (3) Broc Parkes  (Kawasaki Ninja ZX-6R)
Riders' championship standings (after 11 of 13 rounds): (1) Sofuoğlu 223 points (2) Laverty 211 (3) Joan Lascorz  (Kawasaki Ninja ZX-6R) 168
Manufacturers' championship standings: (1) Honda 270 points (2) Kawasaki 188 (3) Triumph 147

Rugby union
Women's World Cup in England:
11th place match:  12–8 
9th place match:  17–29 
7th place match:  8–32 
5th place match:  20–23 
3rd place match:  8–22  
Final:   13–10  
New Zealand win the Cup for the fourth successive time.

Tennis
Grand Slams:
US Open in New York City, United States, day 7:
Men's singles, third round:
Rafael Nadal  [1] def. Gilles Simon  6–4, 6–4, 6–2
Stanislas Wawrinka  [25] def. Andy Murray  [4] 6–7(3), 7–6(4), 6–3, 6–3
Fernando Verdasco  [8] def. David Nalbandian  [31] 6–2, 3–6, 6–3, 6–2
David Ferrer  [10] def. Daniel Gimeno Traver  7–6(2), 6–2, 6–2
Women's singles, fourth round:
Kim Clijsters  [2] def. Ana Ivanovic  6–2, 6–1
Venus Williams  [3] def. Shahar Pe'er  [16] 7–6(3), 6–3
Samantha Stosur  [5] def. Elena Dementieva  [12] 6–3, 2–6, 7–6(2)
Francesca Schiavone  [6] def. Anastasia Pavlyuchenkova  [20] 6–3, 6–0

Water polo
Men's European Championship in Zagreb, Croatia: (teams in bold advance to the semifinals, teams in italics advance to the quarterfinals)
Group A:
 6–12 
 9–9 
 5–8 
Final standings: Croatia, Italy 12 points, Montenegro 10, Romania 7, Spain 3, Turkey 0.
Group B:
 17–3 
 7–6 
 7–4 
Final standings: Hungary 13 points, Serbia 12, Germany 9, Greece 4, Macedonia, Russia 3.

September 4, 2010 (Saturday)

American football
NCAA:
AP Top 10:
(1) Alabama 48, San Jose State 3
(4) Florida 34, Miami (OH) 12
(5) Texas 34, Rice 17
(6) TCU 30, (24) Oregon State 21 in Arlington, Texas
(7) Oklahoma 31, Utah State 24
(8) Nebraska 49, Western Kentucky 10
(9) Iowa 37, Eastern Illinois 7
Other games:
(21) LSU 30, (18) North Carolina 24 in Atlanta
Played earlier this week: (2) Ohio State
Play later this week: (3) Boise State, (10) Virginia Tech

Australian rules football
AFL finals series:
First Qualifying Final in Melbourne:  17.22 (124)–8.14 (62) 
First Elimination Final in Sydney:  14.15 (99)–13.16 (94)

Auto racing
Nationwide Series:
Great Clips 300 in Hampton, Georgia: (1)  Jamie McMurray (Chevrolet; JR Motorsports) (2)  Kyle Busch (Toyota; Joe Gibbs Racing) (3)  Carl Edwards (Ford; Roush Fenway Racing)
Drivers' championship standings (after 26 of 35 races): (1)  Brad Keselowski (Dodge; Penske Racing) 4127 points (2) Edwards 3795 (3) Busch 3576
IndyCar Series:
Kentucky Indy 300 in Sparta, Kentucky: (1) Hélio Castroneves  (Team Penske) (2) Ed Carpenter  (Panther Racing) (3) Dan Wheldon  (Panther Racing)
Drivers' championship standings (after 15 of 17 races): (1) Will Power  (Team Penske) 552 points (2) Dario Franchitti  (Chip Ganassi Racing) 535 (3) Scott Dixon  (Chip Ganassi Racing) 469

Basketball
FIBA World Championship in Istanbul, Turkey:
Eighth–finals:
 73–72 
 80–72

Cycling
Grand Tours:
Vuelta a España:
Stage 8:  David Moncoutié  5h 14' 32"  Serafín Martínez   + 54"  Johann Tschopp  + 54"
General classification: (1) Igor Antón   32h 28' 49" (2) Joaquim Rodríguez  + 0" (3) Vincenzo Nibali   + 2"

Field hockey
Women's World Cup in Rosario, Argentina: (teams in bold advance to the semi-finals)
Pool B:
 2–1 
 2–2 
 0–2 
Standings (after 4 games): Argentina 12 points, England 10, Korea 5, China, South Africa 3, Spain 1.

Football (soccer)
2012 Africa Cup of Nations qualification, matchday 1:
Group A:  1–0 
Group D:  0–0 
Group E:  1–3 
Group F:  3–1 
Group G:  2–0 
Group H:  3–0 
Group I:  2–0 
Group J:
 1–0 
 3–0 
Group K:
 2–1 
 2–2 
Standings: Botswana 10 points (4 matches), Tunisia 4 (3), Malawi 3 (3), Togo 2 (3),  1 (3)
2011 European Under-21 Championship qualification: (teams in bold advance to the playoffs, teams in strike are eliminated)
Group 1:
 1–0 
 0–1 
Standings:  24 points (9 matches),  21 (9), Moldova 13 (9), Latvia 12 (9), Faroe Islands 11 (10), Andorra 1 (10).
Group 2:  0–1 
Standings:  20 points (10 matches), Georgia 15 (9), Turkey 13 (9),  12 (10),  10 (9),  7 (9).
Group 3:  0–1 
Standings: Wales 16 points (7 matches),  13 (7), Hungary 12 (7),  7 (7),  4 (8).
Group 7:  2–2 
Standings: Croatia 17 points (8 matches),  14 (7), Serbia 10 (7),  6 (7),  4 (7).
Group 9:  1–2 
Standings: Greece 19 points (8 matches),  14 (7),  10 (7),  5 (7), Macedonia 2 (7).
Group 10:  3–2 

Rugby union
Tri Nations Series:
 39–41  in Bloemfontein
Standings:  23 points (5 games), Australia 10 (5), South Africa 8 (6).
The All Blacks have already clinched the title.

Tennis
Grand Slams:
US Open in New York City, United States, day 6:
Men's singles, third round:
Roger Federer  [2] def. Paul-Henri Mathieu  6–4, 6–3, 6–3
Novak Djokovic  [3] def. James Blake  6–1, 7–6(4), 6–3
Robin Söderling  [5] def. Thiemo de Bakker  6–2, 6–3, 6–3
Women's singles, third round:
Caroline Wozniacki  [1] def. Chan Yung-jan  6–1, 6–0
Kaia Kanepi  [31] def. Jelena Janković  [4] 6–2, 7–6(1)
Vera Zvonareva  [7] def. Alexandra Dulgheru  [25] 6–2, 7–6(2)

Water polo
Women's European Championship in Zagreb, Croatia: (teams in bold advance to the semi-finals, teams in italics advance to the quarter-finals)
Group A:
 4–29 
 12–12 
Final standings: Greece 7 points, Russia 5, Italy 4, Croatia 0.
Group B:
 10–10 
 7–8 
Final standings: Netherlands, Spain 6 points, Hungary 4, Germany 1.

September 3, 2010 (Friday)

Australian rules football
AFL finals series:
Second Qualifying Final in Melbourne:  11.13 (79)–12.11 (83)

Cricket
ICC Intercontinental Cup in Toronto, day 4:
 120 (32 overs) and 316 (106.5 overs);  261 (71.5 overs) and 176/4 (41.1 overs). Ireland win by 6 wickets.
Standings:  77 points (5 matches),  69 (5),  63 (4), Ireland 52 (5),  43 (5),  15 (6), Canada 9 (6).

Cycling
Grand Tours:
Vuelta a España:
Stage 7:  Alessandro Petacchi  4h 36' 12"  Mark Cavendish  s.t.  Juan José Haedo  s.t.
General classification: (1) Philippe Gilbert   27h 12' 38" (2) Igor Antón  + 10" (3) Joaquim Rodríguez  + 10"

Equestrianism
Show jumping:
FEI Nations Cup Promotional League, Promotional League Europe:
FEI Nations Cup of Spain in Gijón (CSIO 5*):   (Pieter Devos on Utopia van de Donkhoeve, Judy-Ann Melchior on Cha Cha Z, Dirk Demeersman on Bufero vh Panishof, Philippe Le Jeune on Boyante de Muze)  ,  and 
Final standings: (1) Belgium 68 points (2)  61.5  (3)  41
Belgium move into the 2011 Meydan FEI Nations Cup.
Italy, Norway,  and  qualify for the Promotional League Final.

Field hockey
Women's World Cup in Rosario, Argentina:
Pool A:
 1–4 
 1–4 
 2–2 
Standings (after 3 games): Netherlands, Germany 9 points, Australia 6, Japan, New Zealand 1, India 0.
Pool B:
 1–4 
 1–1 
 0–4 
Standings (after 3 games): Argentina 9 points, England 7, Korea 4, China, South Africa 3, Spain 0.

Football (soccer)
UEFA Euro 2012 qualifying:
Group A:
 0–3 
 0–1 
Group B:
 0–1 
 0–2 
 1–0 
Group C:
 0–3 
 1–2 
 0–1 
Group D:
 1–1 
 0–3 
 0–1 
Group E:
 2–0 
 2–0 
 0–5 
Group F:
 1–1 
 0–3 
Group G:
 1–0 
 4–0 
Group H:
 1–2 
 4–4 
Group I:
 0–0 
 0–4 
2011 European Under-21 Championship qualification: (teams in bold advance to the playoffs, teams in strike are eliminated)
Group 1:  3–0 
Standings: Romania 24 points (9 matches), Russia 21 (9),  11 (9),  10 (8),  9 (8),  1 (9).
Group 2:  1–0 
Standings: Switzerland 20 points (10 matches),  13 (8),  12 (8),  12 (10),  10 (9), Republic of Ireland 7 (9).
Group 3:  0–1 
Standings:  13 points (6 matches), Italy 13 (7),  12 (6), Bosnia and Herzegovina 7 (7),  4 (8).
Group 4:  2–0 
Standings:  21 points (8 matches),  16 (7), Poland 9 (7), Finland 7 (7),  0 (7).
Group 5:
 4–0 
 1–1  
Standings: Czech Republic 19 points (7 matches),  16 (7), Germany 9 (7), Northern Ireland 7 (7), San Marino 0 (8).
Group 6:  1–2 
Standings: Sweden 16 points (7 matches), Israel 13 (7),  5 (8),  4 (7).
Group 7:  1–3  
Standings:  16 points (7 matches),  14 (7),  9 (6), Cyprus 6 (7), Norway 4 (7).
Group 8:
 2–2 
 2–2 
Standings: Ukraine 15 points (7 matches), Belgium 15 (8), France 12 (7), Slovenia 7 (7),  0 (7).
Group 9:  0–1 
Standings:  16 points (7 matches), England 14 (7), Portugal 10 (7),  5 (7),  2 (6).
Group 10:  1–1 
Standings: Belarus, Scotland 14 points (7 matches),  4 (7),  1 (6).

Tennis
Grand Slams:
US Open in New York City, United States, day 5:
Men's singles, second round:
Rafael Nadal  [1] def. Denis Istomin  6–2, 7–6(5), 7–5
Andy Murray  [4] def. Dustin Brown  7–5, 6–3, 6–0
Fernando Verdasco  [8] def. Adrian Mannarino  6–1, 6–2, 6–2
David Ferrer  [10] def. Benjamin Becker  6–3, 6–4, 6–4
Women's singles, third round:
Kim Clijsters  [2] def. Petra Kvitová  6–3, 6–0
Venus Williams  [3] def. Mandy Minella  6–2, 6–1
Samantha Stosur  [5] def. Sara Errani  6–2, 6–3
Francesca Schiavone  [6] def. Alona Bondarenko  6–1, 7–5

Water polo
Men's European Championship in Zagreb, Croatia:
Group A:
 22–2 
 10–7 
 6–8 
Standings (after 4 games): Italy 12 points, Montenegro, Croatia 9, Romania 6, Spain, Turkey 0.
Group B:
 19–9 
 14–10 
 5–6 
Standings (after 4 games): Hungary 10 points, Serbia, Germany 9, Greece 4, Macedonia 3, Russia 0.

September 2, 2010 (Thursday)

American football
NCAA:
AP Top 10: (2) Ohio State 45, Marshall 7
Other games: Utah 27, (15) Pittsburgh 24 (OT)

Basketball
FIBA World Championship in Turkey: (teams in bold advance to the knockout stage)
Group A in Kayseri:
 55–76 
 82–84 
 73–91 
Final standings: Serbia, Argentina 9 points, Australia 8, Angola, Germany 7, Jordan 5.
Group B in Istanbul:
 92–57 
 65–60 
 92–74 
Final standings: United States 10 points, Slovenia 9, Brazil 8, Croatia 7, Iran 6, Tunisia 5.
Group C in Ankara:
 79–88 
 69–73 
 87–40 
Final standings: Turkey 10 points, Russia 9, Greece 8, China, Puerto Rico, Côte d'Ivoire 6.
Group D in İzmir:
 89–67 
 66–84 
 82–70 
Final standings: Lithuania 10 points, Spain, New Zealand, France 8, Lebanon 6, Canada 5.
WNBA Playoffs:
Western Conference Finals, Game 1: (1) Seattle Storm 82, (2) Phoenix Mercury 74. Storm lead series 1–0.

Cricket
ICC Intercontinental Cup in Toronto, day 3:
 120 (32 overs) and 316 (106.5 overs; Kevin O'Brien 5/39);  261 (71.5 overs) and 124/4 (29 overs). Ireland require another 52 runs with 6 wickets remaining.

Cycling
Grand Tours:
Vuelta a España:
Stage 6:  Thor Hushovd  3h 36' 20"  Daniele Bennati  s.t.  Grega Bole  s.t.
General classification: (1) Philippe Gilbert   22h 36' 26" (2) Igor Antón  + 10" (3) Joaquim Rodríguez  + 10"

Field hockey
Women's World Cup in Rosario, Argentina:
Pool B:
Standings (after 2 games): Argentina, England 6 points, Korea, South Africa 3, Spain, China 0.

Football (soccer)
UEFA Euro 2012 qualifying:
Group F:  3–1 
2011 UEFA European Under-21 Football Championship qualification: (team in bold advances to the playoffs, teams in strike are eliminated)
Group 4:  2–1 
Standings: Netherlands 21 points (8 matches), Spain 16 (7),  9 (6),  4 (6),  0 (7).
Copa Sudamericana First stage, second leg: (first leg scores in parentheses)
Olimpia  1–1 (0–2)  Defensor Sporting. Defensor Sporting win 4–1 on points.
Copa Sudamericana second stage, first leg:
Vélez Sársfield  0–1  Banfield

Snooker
Premier League Snooker – League phase in Southampton:
Shaun Murphy  5–1 Ding Junhui 
Ronnie O'Sullivan  3–3 Marco Fu

Tennis
Grand Slams:
US Open in New York City, United States, day 4:
Men's singles, second round:
Roger Federer  [2] def. Andreas Beck  6–3, 6–4, 6–3
Novak Djokovic [3]  def. Philipp Petzschner  7–5, 6–3, 7–6(6)
Robin Söderling  [5] def. Taylor Dent  6–2, 6–2, 6–4
Richard Gasquet  def. Nikolay Davydenko  [6] 6–3, 6–4, 6–2
Women's singles, second round:
Caroline Wozniacki  [1] def. Chang Kai-chen  6–0, 6–0
Jelena Janković  [4] def. Mirjana Lučić  6–4, 3–6, 6–2
Vera Zvonareva  [7] def. Sabine Lisicki  6–1, 7–6(5)
Peng Shuai  def. Agnieszka Radwańska  [9] 2–6, 6–1, 6–4

Water polo
Women's European Championship in Zagreb, Croatia:
Group A:
 7–7 
 3–22 
Standings (after 2 games): Russia, Greece 4 points, Italy 3, Croatia 0.
Group B:
 17–10 
 13–10 
Standings (after 2 games): Spain 6 points, Netherlands, Hungary 3, Germany 0.

September 1, 2010 (Wednesday)

Basketball
FIBA World Championship in Turkey: (teams in bold advance to the knockout stage, teams in strike are eliminated)
Group A in Kayseri:
 94–79 
 88–92 (OT) 
 88–79 
Standings (after 4 games): Argentina 8 points, Serbia 7, Australia, Angola 6, Germany 5, Jordan 4.
Group B in Istanbul:
 84–64 
 51–88 
 77–80 
Standings (after 4 games): United States 8 points, Slovenia 7, Brazil, Croatia 6, Iran 5, Tunisia 4.
Group C in Ankara:
 80–89 
 60–97 
 79–77 
Standings (after 4 games): Turkey 8 points, Greece, Russia 7, Puerto Rico, China 5, Côte d'Ivoire 4.
Group D in İzmir:
 61–71 
 57–91 
 69–55 
Standings (after 4 games): Lithuania 8 points, France 7, Spain, New Zealand 6, Lebanon 5, Canada 4.
WNBA Playoffs:
Eastern Conference First Round, Game 3: (2) New York Liberty 77, (3) Indiana Fever 74. Liberty win series 2–1.

Cricket
ICC Intercontinental Cup in Toronto, day 2:
 120 (32 overs) and 190/8 (62 overs);  261 (71.5 overs; Henry Osinde 5/68). Canada lead by 49 runs with 2 wickets remaining.

Cycling
Grand Tours:
Vuelta a España:
Stage 5:  Tyler Farrar  5h 03' 36"  Koldo Fernández  s.t.  Mark Cavendish  s.t.
General classification: (1) Philippe Gilbert   19h 00' 06" (2) Igor Antón   + 10" (3) Joaquim Rodríguez  + 10"

Field hockey
Women's World Cup in Rosario, Argentina:
Pool A:
 3–6 
 7–3 
 2–1 
Standings (after 2 games): Netherlands, Australia, Germany 6 points, Japan, New Zealand, India 0.

Football (soccer)
Copa Sudamericana First stage, second leg: (first leg scores in parentheses)
River Plate  4–2 (0–2)  Guaraní. 3–3 on points, 4–4 on aggregate; Guaraní win on away goals rule.
Trujillanos  1–1 (1–4)  Atlético Huila. Atlético Huila win 4–1 on points.

Rugby union
Women's World Cup in England:
9th–12th place:
 25–10 
 32–10 
5th–8th place:
 41–0 
 3–40 
Semi-finals:
 45–7 
 15–0

Tennis
Grand Slams:
US Open in New York City, United States, day 3:
Men's singles, first round:
Andy Murray  [4] def. Lukáš Lacko  6–3, 6–2, 6–2
Michaël Llodra  def. Tomáš Berdych  [7] 7–6(3), 6–4, 6–4
Men's singles, second round: Janko Tipsarević  def. Andy Roddick  [9] 3–6, 7–5, 6–3, 7–6(4)
Women's singles, second round:
Kim Clijsters  [2] def. Sally Peers  6–2, 6–1
Venus Williams  [3] def. Rebecca Marino  7–6(3), 6–3
Samantha Stosur  [5] def. Anastasia Rodionova  6–1, 6–4
Francesca Schiavone  [6] def. Maria Elena Camerin  6–2, 6–1
Gisela Dulko  def. Victoria Azarenka  [10] 5–1 retired

Water polo
Men's European Championship in Zagreb, Croatia:
Group A:
 4–9 
 7–13 
 8–7 
Standings (after 3 games): Italy 9 points, Croatia, Montenegro, Romania 6, Spain, Turkey 0.
Group B:
 10–16 
 7–8 
 6–6 
Standings (after 3 games): Hungary 7 points, Serbia, Germany 6, Greece 4, Macedonia 3, Russia 0.

References

VIIII